= Kugi Uswag Sugbo =

Political party in the Philippines

- Abbreviation: KUSUG
- Leader: Raymond Alvin Garcia
- Founder: Alvin Garcia
- National affiliation: PFP (since 2024); PDP (2018-2024); UNA (2012-2018); Nacionalista (2009-2012); UNO (2007-2009); KNP (2004); KAMPI (until 2004)
- Colours: Red
- House of Representatives (Cebu City seats): 1 / 2
- City Mayor: 0 / 1
- City Vice Mayor: 0 / 1
- Cebu City Council: 6 / 16

Kugi Uswag Sugbo (lit. transl. Work Hard Progress Cebu), commonly known as KUSUG, is a local political party based in Cebu City, Philippines and was founded by former Mayor Alvin Garcia.

It was formerly allied with the Partido Barug of former mayor Michael Rama from 2013 to 2024.

== Electoral performance ==
=== Mayor ===
Election	Candidate	Number of votes	Share of votes	Outcome of election
2001	Alvin Garcia	125,694	—N/a	Lost
2004	Alvin Garcia	140,629	—N/a	Lost
2007	Mary Ann de los Santos	112,354	—N/a	Lost
2010	Alvin Garcia	120,327	33.39	Lost
2013	—N/a	215,425	50.70	Supported Michael Rama who won
2016	—N/a	232,925	46.60	Supported Michael Rama who lost
2019	—N/a	265,738	51.40	Supported Edgardo Labella who won
2022	—N/a	239,656	40.85	Supported Michael Rama who won
2025	Raymond Alvin Garcia	176,967	30.30	Lost

=== Vice Mayor ===
Election	Candidate	Number of votes	Share of votes	Outcome of election
2001	Koko Holganza	—N/a	—N/a	Lost
2004	Ramiro Madarang	—N/a	—N/a	Lost
2007	Raymond Alvin Garcia	82,640	—N/a	Lost
2010	Rodolfo Cabrera	59,990	17.53	Lost
2013	—N/a	200,605	50.05	Supported Edgardo Labella who won
2016	—N/a	252,201	53.15	Supported Edgardo Labella who won
2019	—N/a	261,685	51.91	Supported Michael Rama who won
2022	Raymond Alvin Garcia	283,235	52.21	Won
2025	Jose Daluz III	147,343	25.77	Lost

== See also ==
- Partido Barug
- Partido Panaghiusa
- Bando Osmeña – Pundok Kauswagan
