= Partido Panaghiusa =

Political party in the Philippines

- Abbreviation: PANAGHIUSA
- Leader: Jose Daluz III
- President: Jose Daluz III
- Chairperson: Floro Casas Jr.
- Founder: Nenita Cortes-Daluz
- National affiliation: PFP (since 2024)
- Colours: Dark purple and red

Partido Panaghiusa, commonly known as Panaghiusa, is a local political party based in Cebu City, Philippines and was founded by then radio personality and politician Nenita Cortes-Daluz and was revived in March 2021 by her son, former Cebu City Councilor Jose Daluz III, who is currently serving as its party leader. It was allied with Partido Barug of incumbent mayor Michael Rama and Kugi Uswag Sugbo since 2021, until Rama broke off the alliance with BARUG in 2024, leaving KUSUG as Panaghiusa's coalition ally.

On December 7, 2021, Daluz confirmed the selection of former Cebu City administrator Floro Casas Jr. as the party's new chairperson just before the death of former Cebu City mayor Edgardo Labella in November 2021. Daluz also announced the party's endorsement for the 2022 elections of incumbent Manila mayor Isko Moreno and incumbent Davao City mayor Sara Duterte for president and vice president, respectively.

== Electoral performance ==
=== Mayor ===
Election	Candidate	Number of votes	Share of votes	Outcome of election
2016	—	232,925	46.60	Supported Michael Rama who lost
2019	—	265,738	51.40	Supported Edgardo Labella who won
2022	—	239,656	40.85	Supported Michael Rama who won
2025	—	176,967	30.30	Supported Raymond Alvin Garcia who lost

=== Vice Mayor ===
Election	Candidate	Number of votes	Share of votes	Outcome of election
2016	—	252,201	53.15	Supported Edgardo Labella who won
2019	—	261,685	51.91	Supported Michael Rama who won
2022	—	283,235	52.21	Supported Raymond Alvin Garcia who won
2025	Joey Daluz III	147,343	25.77	Lost

== See also ==
- Partido Barug
- Kugi Uswag Sugbo
- Bando Osmeña – Pundok Kauswagan
