= Rodrigo Abellanosa =

Filipino politician

Member of the Philippine House of Representatives from Cebu City's 2nd district
- In office June 30, 2013 – June 30, 2022
- Preceded by: Tomas Osmeña
- Succeeded by: Eduardo Rama Jr.
House of Representatives positions
Chair of the Philippine House Committee on Natural Resources
In office August 1, 2018 – June 30, 2019
Preceded by	Arnel Ty
Succeeded by	Elpidio Barzaga Jr.

Member of the Cebu City Council from the 2nd district
- In office June 30, 2004 – June 30, 2013

Barangay Captain of Duljo Fatima, Cebu City
- In office June 30, 1994 – June 30, 2004

Personal details
- Born: Rodrigo Abellana Abellanosa; December 2, 1961 (age 64) Cebu City, Philippines
- Party: Independent (2024–present); BO–PK (2003–present)
- Other party: LDP (2018–2024); Liberal (2009–2018); Lakas-CMD (2003–2009)
- Education: Asian Institute of Management; University of the Philippines Diliman; Ateneo de Manila University
- Profession: Politician
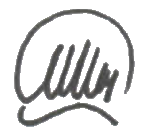
- Signature

Rodrigo "Bebot" Abellana Abellanosa (born December 2, 1961) is a Filipino politician who served as the representative for the 2nd district (south district) of Cebu City from 2013 to 2022. He was a member of the Cebu City Council representing the 2nd district from 2004 to 2013, and was the barangay captain of Duljo Fatima, Cebu City from 1994 to 2004.

== Early career ==
Abellanosa established the Asian Computer Institute (ACI), the precursor of Asian College of Technology (ACT) on September 19, 1988, in Colon Street, Cebu City. He went on to serve as president of ACT and Asian College of Technology International Education Foundation Inc. (ACTIEF).

== Political career ==
=== Barangay captain (1994–2004) ===
Abellanosa served as Barangay Captain of Duljo-Fatima in Cebu City from 1994.

=== Cebu City Council (2004–2013) ===
Abellanosa served as City Councilor for three consecutive terms from 2004 to 2013.

He first ran as City Councilor of the South District under Bando Osmeña – Pundok Kauswagan of Mayor Tomas Osmeña.

In the 10th Sangguniang Panlungsod (SP), he was designated as Chairman of the Committee on Family & Women and Committee on Local & International Relations.

In the 11th Sangguniang Panlungsod (SP), he was designated as Chairman of the Committee on Social Services. He also served as Vice Chairman of the Committee on Public Services and the Committee on Family & Women.

In the 12th Sangguniang Panlungsod (SP), he was designated as the Presiding Officer Pro Tempore and Chairman of the Committee on Social Services. He also served as Vice Chairman of the Committee on Education, Science and Technology and the Committee on Trade, Commerce, Cooperatives and Entrepreneurship in the 12th SP.

=== House of Representatives (2013–2022) ===
Abellanosa ran for Representative of Cebu City 2nd district (South) to succeed Tomas Osmeña who unsuccessfully ran as Mayor in the 2013 elections. He won against Aristotle Batuhan in 2013, Gerardo Carillo in 2016 and Jocelyn Pesquera in 2019.

He was supposed to run against Antonio Cuenco, the former 2nd District (South) Representative of Cebu City but on September 7, 2012, Cuenco announced that he was retiring from politics for health reasons. In a letter read by his son James Anthony Cuenco, the former Deputy Speaker said that he suffered vertigo during a sortie. Cuenco endorsed then Cebu City Councilor Jose Daluz III as his replacement but eventually, former DOTC undersecretary Aristotle "Totol" Batuhan was chosen by Team Rama to run against Abellanosa.

On December 13, 2012, a complaint was filed by a certain Phillip Banguiran, a resident of barangay Inayawan, Cebu City citing Republic Act 3019 or the Anti-Graft and Corrupt Practices Act by asking the Ombudsman in the Visayas to investigate Abellanosa because his school, Asian College of Technology, was the biggest recipient of the city's scholarship program.

On October 11, 2016, the Office of the Ombudsman filed a graft case before the anti-graft court Sandiganbayan against Abellanosa over an alleged P51-million anomalous transaction when he was a city councilor. He was accused of having an unlawful interest in Cebu City's distribution of PHP 51.065 million in scholarship programs when he was a city councilor in 2011.

Then Ombudsman Conchita Carpio-Morales approved the charge sheet against Abellanosa on September 29, 2016. The prosecution said that as a member of the Sangguniang Panglungsod, Abellanosa showed unlawful interest in the passage of City Resolution No. 12-3355-2011, which authorized the city mayor to enter into a Memorandum of Agreement (MOA) with the Asian College of Technology and International Educational Foundation (ACTIEF) where he was a trustee and president of ACTIEF at the time.

The prosecution said Abellanosa entered into an MOA with the Cebu City government on behalf of ACTIEF for the implementation of a city-funded scholarship program.

Records obtained by graft investigators showed ACTIEF was entrusted with PHP 51.065 million scholarship funds, which the Ombudsman said was prejudicial to the government and public interest.

The Ombudsman found him guilty of grave misconduct and meted him the penalty of dismissal of service but in a 10-page resolution that was promulgated on January 27, 2017, the Sandiganbayan granted the motion to quash information filed by Abellanosa, saying that the facts in the case do not constitute an offense. Thus, the higher court ordered to lift the hold-departure order issued against him and released the bond he posted for his provisional liberty.

In a 10-page decision promulgated on December 21, 2017, the Special 20th Division of the Court of Appeals (CA) reversed the decision of the Office of the Ombudsman finding Abellanosa guilty of grave misconduct for his involvement in the City Government's scholarship program while he was still a councilor thus allowing him to continue to serve as Congressman. Associate Justice Geraldine Fiel-Macaraig banked on the doctrine of condonation in favoring Abellanosa.

Macaraig, who pinned her opinion, which was affirmed by two other associate justices, said that contrary to the grounds of the Ombudsman, Abellanosa's election as congressman during the 2013 elections rendered the imposition of the administrative offense of grave misconduct moot and academic on the basis of condonation doctrine.

Based on the 2018 Statements of Assets, Liabilities and Net Worth (SALNs), Abellanosa remained as the richest Cebuano lawmaker who declared PHP 71.4 million net worth or actual wealth as of December 31, 2018.

Abellanosa's net worth is PHP 2.1 million more than his PHP 69.3 million net worth in 2017 while in 2016, he had PHP 68.8 million actual wealth. Since 2016 up to 2018, he declared no liabilities.

==== Legislative portfolio ====
As a member of 16th and 17th Congress, Abellanosa authored 170 bills and co-authored 76 bills.

Abellanosa is the principal author of the House version of the following laws:

Republic Act (House Bill)	Short title	Long title	Source
R.A. 11189 (HB 6620)		An Act Increasing the Bed Capacity of St. Anthony Mother and Child Hospital in Cebu City from Twenty-Five (25) to Two Hundred (200), and Appropriating Funds Therefor	
R.A. 11185 (HB 6030)		An Act Integrating the Cebu City Mountain Extension Campus as a Satellite Campus of the Cebu Technological University and Appropriating Funds Therefor, Amending for the Purpose Republic Act No. 9744, Otherwise Known as "An Act Converting the Cebu State College of Science and Technology System in the City of Cebu and All its Satellite Campuses Located in the Province of Cebu into a State University to be Known as the Cebu Technological University (CTU) and Appropriating Funds Therefor	
R.A. 10928 (HB 4767)		An Act Extending the Validity of Philippine Passports, Amending for the Purpose Section 10 OF Republic Act No. 8239, Otherwise Known as the "Philippine Passport Act OF 1996″, and for Other Purposes	
R.A. 10644 (HB 4595)	Go Negosyo Act	An Act Promoting Job Generation and Inclusive Growth through the Development of Micro, Small and Medium Enterprises	
R.A. 10931 (HB 5633)	Universal Access to Quality Tertiary Education Act	An Act Promoting Universal Access to Quality Tertiary Education by Providing for Free Tuition and Other School Fees in State Universities and Colleges, Local Universities and Colleges and State-Run Technical Vocational Institutions, Establishing the Tertiary Education Subsidy and Student Loan Program, Strengthening the Unified Student Financial Assistance System for Tertiary Education and Appropriating Funds Therefor	
R.A. 11462 (HB 4933)		An Act Postponing the May 2020 Barangay and Sangguniang Kabataan Elections, Amending for the Purpose Republic Act No. 9164, As Amended by Republic Act No. 9340, Republic Act No. 10632, Republic Act No. 10656, Republic Act No. 10923 and Republic Act No. 10952, and for Other Purposes	

== Electoral history ==
Electoral history of Rodrigo A. Abellanosa
Year	Office Constituency	Party (Note: Filipino local politicians more commonly campaign in their constituencies based on local parties and alliances, rather than on their national parties. It is also common for local parties and alliances to switch affiliations to another national party, especially following the election of a new President.)		Main opponent (Note: The listed main opponent is either the victorious candidate (in an election defeat) or the second-ranked candidate (in a victory). No main opponent is listed for positions with multiple officeholders, e.g. City Councilor.)		Votes for Abellanosa					Result	Ref
Year	Office Constituency	Local	National	Name	Party	Total	%	±%	Mgn. (Note: For offices with only one winner (e.g. Mayor), margins shown are over the main or winning opponent. For offices with multiple winners (e.g. City Council), margins shown are over the highest-ranked losing candidate.)	P. (Note: The top 8 candidates for the Cebu City Council in each district are elected. All 16 councilors are ranked based on how much votes they each got compared to all other councilors, rather than on their rankings within their district. In contrast, only the 1st-ranked candidate for Mayor, Vice Mayor, and Representative posts wins.)	Result	Ref
1994	Barangay Captain; Duljo Fatima, Cebu City	Nonpartisan (Note: While Barangay officials and alliances commonly align with City- or Municipal-level political parties, they are officially required to be nonpartisan and independent of political parties during Barangay elections, as per Section 4 of the Barangay Election Act of 1982.)		—N/a		—N/a	—N/a	—N/a	—N/a	1st	Won	
1997	Barangay Captain; Duljo Fatima, Cebu City	Nonpartisan		—N/a		—N/a	—N/a	—N/a	—N/a	1st	Won	
2002	Barangay Captain; Duljo Fatima, Cebu City	Nonpartisan		—N/a		—N/a	—N/a	—N/a	—N/a	1st	Won	
2004	City Councilor; Cebu City 2nd district	BOPK	Lakas-CMD	—N/a		106,053	—N/a	—N/a	—N/a	1st	Won	
2007	City Councilor; Cebu City 2nd district	BOPK	Lakas-CMD	—N/a		—N/a	—N/a	—N/a	—N/a	—N/a	Won	
2010	City Councilor; Cebu City 2nd district	BOPK	Liberal	—N/a		137,676	10.37%	—N/a	5.47%	1st	Won	
2013	Representative; Cebu City 2nd District	BOPK	Liberal	Aristotle Batuhan	BARUG	123,757	55.54%	— (Note: 2013 vote percentage non-comparable to previous election due to running for a position with a single officeholder (Representative) after previously running for a position with multiple officeholders (City Councilor).)	11.08%	1st	Won	
2016	Representative; Cebu City 2nd District	BOPK	Liberal	Gerry Carillo	BARUG	148,838	59.26%	+3.72%	20.52%	1st	Won	
2019	Representative; Cebu City 2nd District	BOPK	LDP	Jocelyn Pesquera	BARUG	163,752	61.22%	+1.96%	22.40%	1st	Won	
2022	Term-limited as representative, did not run (Note: In 2022, BOPK fielded Abellanosa's son, BG Rodrigo Abellanosa, for South District Representative. The younger Abellanosa lost to City Councilor Eduardo Rama Jr. of BARUG.)											
2025	Representative; Cebu City 2nd District	BOPK	Independent	Eduardo Rama Jr. (Incumbent)	BARUG	131,723	42.11%	-19.11%	-15.78%	2nd	Lost	

== Personal life ==
Abellanosa has three children, namely Jose Lorenzo, BG Rodrigo, and Angel Vianne. Jose is currently a City Councilor from the 2nd District on his 2nd term.

House of Representatives of the Philippines
Preceded by Tomas Osmeña	Member of the Philippine House of Representatives from 2nd District of Cebu City; 2013–2022	Succeeded by Eduardo Rama Jr.
