= Rachel del Mar =

Filipina politician (born 1966)

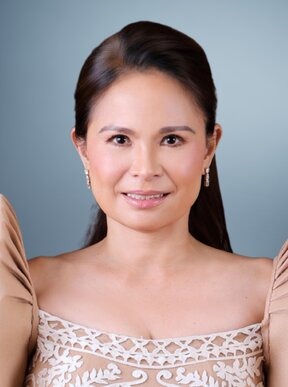
- Official portrait, 2025

Member of the Philippine House of Representatives from Cebu City's 1st District
- Incumbent
- Assumed office June 30, 2022
- Preceded by: Raul del Mar
- In office June 30, 2010 – June 30, 2013
- Preceded by: Raul del Mar
- Succeeded by: Raul del Mar

Personal details
- Born: Rachel Marguerite Borromeo del Mar; November 3, 1966 (age 59) Cebu City, Cebu, Philippines
- Party: KUSUG (local; 2024–present); NUP (national; 2026–present)
- Other political affiliations: BOPK (2009–2024); Liberal (2009–2021); NPC (2021–2026)
- Parents: Raul del Mar (father); Melanie Borromeo (mother)
- Relatives: Raoul del Mar (brother)
- Education: University of San Jose-Recoletos

Rachel Marguerite "Cutie" Borromeo del Mar (born November 3, 1966) is a Filipino politician. She currently serves as the representative for the 1st district of Cebu City, a post she also held from 2010 to 2013.

== Early life and education ==
A native of Cebu City, del Mar spent her elementary years at the Cebu International School, and went to high school at Saint Theresa's College of Cebu. She began collegiate studies at the University of the Philippines Cebu (then a college of the University of the Philippines Visayas), majoring in hotel and restaurant management, and eventually earned her B.A. in mass communications, cum laude, at the University of San Jose-Recoletos. She is currently working towards a master's degree in public management at the Ateneo de Manila University.

== Early career ==
In 2007, then president Gloria Macapagal Arroyo appointed del Mar to the board of directors of the Cultural Center of the Philippines. That same year, she was also named as one of the board members of the Movie and Television Review and Classification Board (MTRCB). Her tenure with both institutions lasted until November 2009.

Del Mar started co-hosting the talk show "She Said, She Said" in August 2008 with Jackie Aquino-Gavino, a TV personality and a first cousin of then president Benigno Aquino III. Aside from this, she has also performed with the theater group Repertory Philippines, has done both runway and commercial modeling, and has played bit parts in both local and foreign films shot in the Philippines.

Her most recent position prior to taking her congressional seat was as chief of staff to her father, former Congressman and Deputy Speaker of the House of Representatives Raul del Mar. She held this post from July 2008 to November 2009 to which she then resigned to begin her electoral campaign.

== Political career ==
As her father wrapped up his third and last term as congressman, the younger del Mar was selected to run in his place. In the 2010 elections, her closest rival was then Lahug barangay captain Mary Ann de los Santos. She defeated de los Santos by close to 40,000 votes.

Del Mar previously served as the vice chairperson of the Committee on Inter-Parliamentary Relations and Diplomacy, as well of the Committee on Public Information. She was also a member of the committees on Appropriations, Games and Amusements, Legislative Franchises, and Tourism.

During the 15th Congress, del Mar sponsored several bills such as House Bill 00023, "An Act Providing for a Magna Carta of the Poor", House Bill 00372, "An Act Requiring the Mandatory Pre-Audit of Government Disbursements and Uses of Funds", HB00559, "An Act to Include Entrepreneurial and Financial Literacy Education for Secondary School Students", among many others. She has also co-authored or co-sponsored to well over 200 bills. She was also noted for her perfect record of attendance while Congress was in session.

=== Committee assignments ===
- Committee on Inter-Parliamentary Relations and Diplomacy
- Committee on Public Information
- Committee on Appropriations
- Committee on Games and Amusements
- Committee on Legislative Franchises
- Committee on Tourism

==== Other leadership positions ====
- Assistant Secretary, Cebu Chamber of Commerce & Industry

== Electoral history ==
As of 2025, Del Mar ran and won in a total of three elections. More detailed lists of candidates and votes in each election may be found in the respective election's article.

Electoral history of Rachel Marguerite B. Del Mar
Year	Office Constituency	Party (Note: Filipino local politicians more commonly campaign in their constituencies based on local parties and alliances, rather than on their national parties. It is also common for local parties and alliances to switch affiliations to another national party, especially following the election of a new President.)		Main opponent (Note: The listed main opponent is either the victorious candidate (in an election defeat) or the second-ranked candidate (in a victory). No main opponent is listed for positions with multiple officeholders, e.g. City Councilor.)		Votes for Del Mar					Result	Ref
Year	Office Constituency	Local	National	Name	Party	Total	%	±%	Mgn.	P.	Result	Ref
2010	Representative; Cebu City 1st district	BOPK	Liberal	Mary Ann de los Santos	KUSUG	98,501	58.49%	—N/a	23.76%	1st	Won	
Did not run in 2013, 2016, and 2019 (Note: Del Mar ran for Congress again after her father, Rep. Raul del Mar, died midway through his third consecutive term on November 16, 2020.)
2022	Representative; Cebu City 1st district	BOPK	NPC	Prisca Niña Mabatid	BARUG	117,512	45.99%	-12.5%	20.65%	1st	Won	
2025	Representative; Cebu City 1st district	KUSUG	NPC	Franklyn Ong	BARUG	105,581	42.26%	-3.73%	9.56	1st	Won	
