= 2025 Cebu City local elections =

Part of the 2025 Philippine general election

2025 Cebu City mayoral election
- May 12, 2025
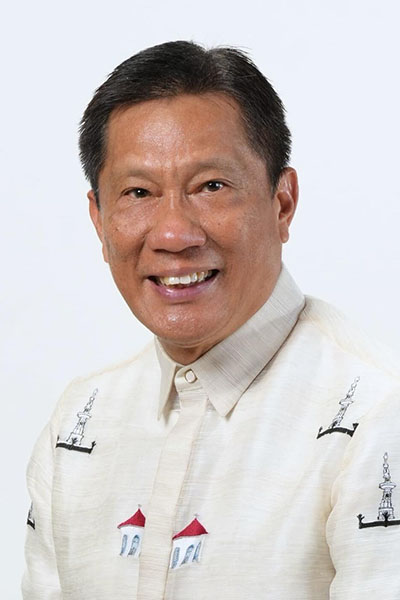

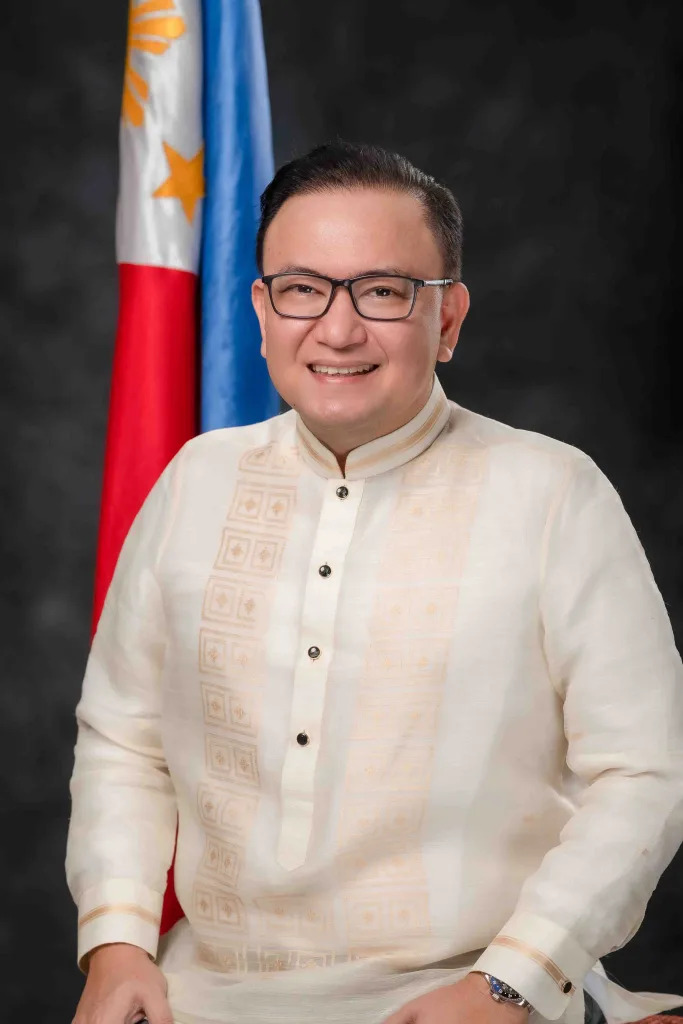

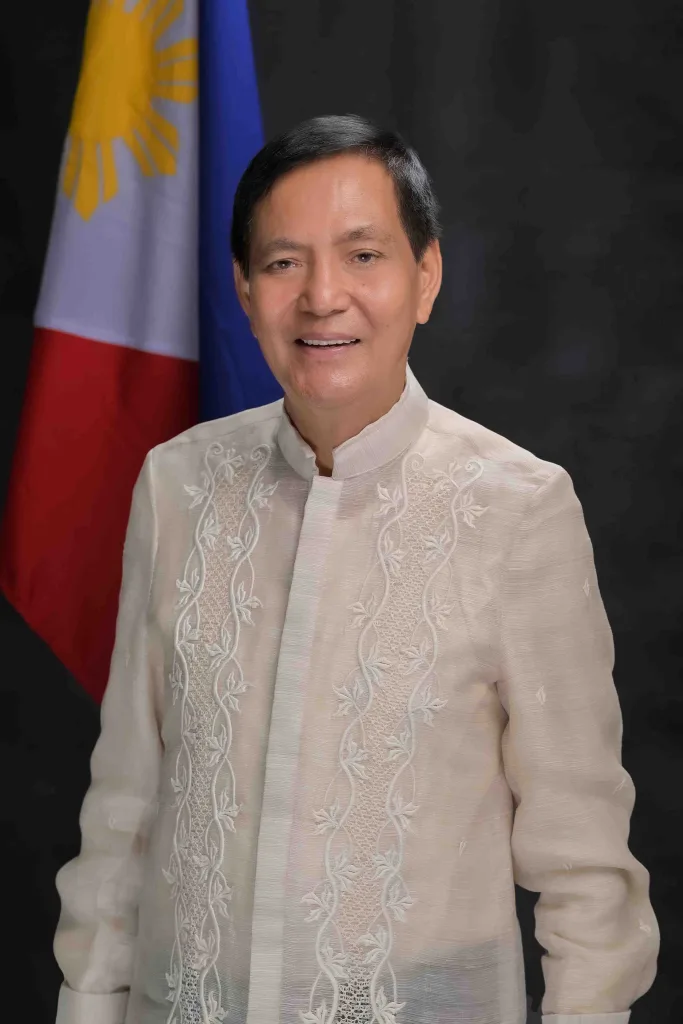
Nominee	Nestor Archival	Raymond Alvin Garcia	Michael Rama
Party	Liberal	PFP	Partido Barug
Running mate	Tomas Osmeña	Joey Daluz	Dondon Hontiveros
Popular vote	256,197	176,967	120,124
Percentage	43.86%	30.30%	20.57%
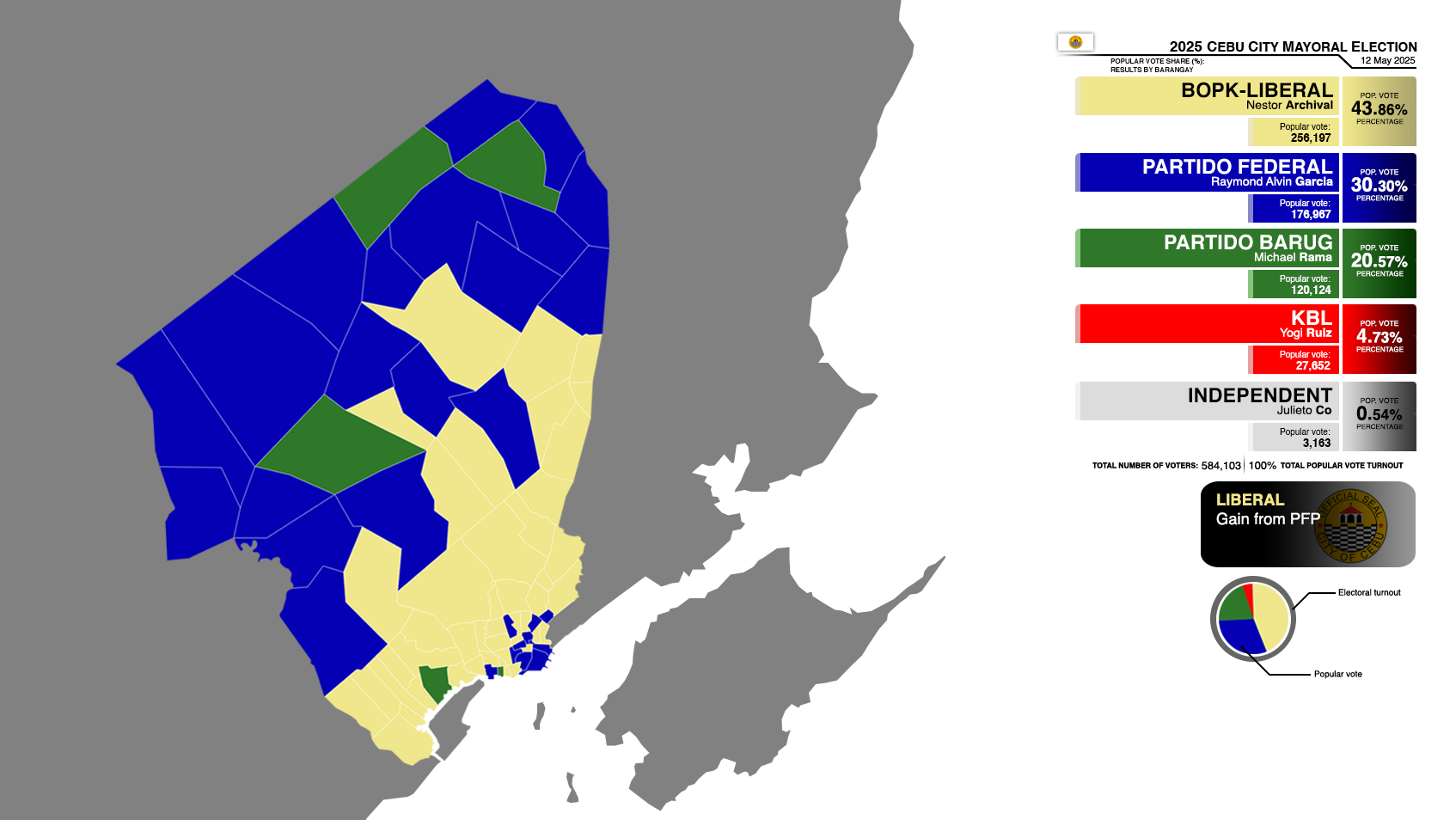
- Election result of the 2025 Cebu City mayoral elections.
Mayor before election
Raymond Alvin Garcia
KUSUG–Panaghiusa
PFP
Elected Mayor
Nestor Archival
BOPK
Liberal
- Vice mayoral election
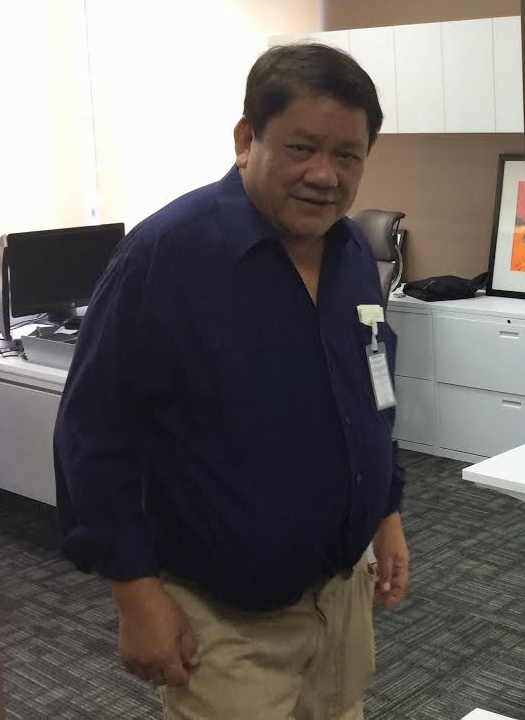

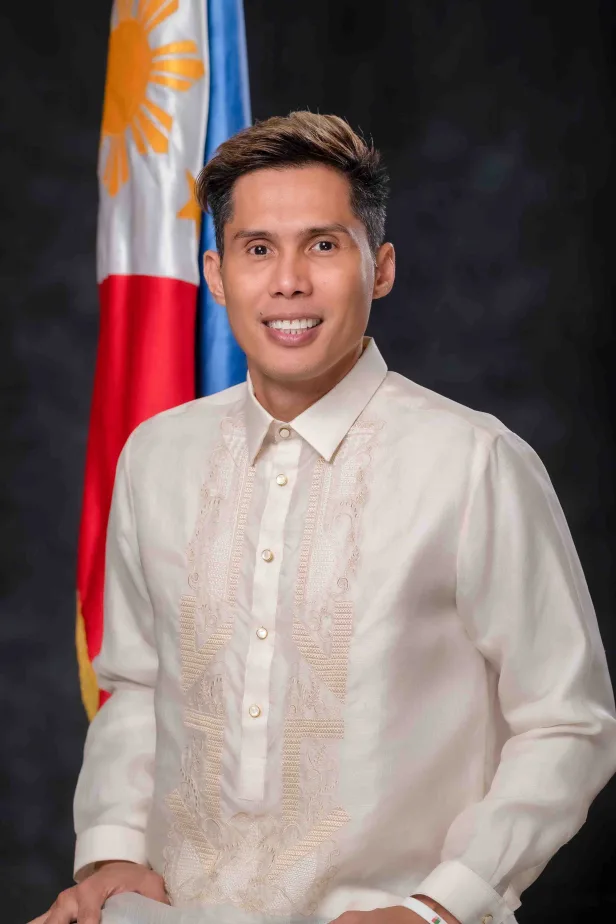

Candidate	Tomas Osmeña	Dondon Hontiveros	Joey Daluz
Party	Liberal	Partido Barug	PFP
Popular vote	233,906	190,586	147,343
Percentage	40.90%	33.33%	25.77%
Vice Mayor before election
Dondon Hontiveros
Partido Barug
Elected Vice Mayor
Tomas Osmeña
BOPK
Liberal

Local elections were held in Cebu City on May 12, 2025, as part of the 2025 Philippine general election. Registered voters of the city elected a mayor, a vice mayor, district representatives, and councilors. Both the mayor and the vice mayor are elected via a first-past-the-post electoral system. On the other hand, the legislative branches include the two district representatives of Cebu City, electing one district representative with 8 councilors. The officials elected will assume their respective offices on June 30, 2025, for a three-year term.

Cebu City councilor and minority leader Nestor Archival won the election, garnering 256,197 votes, defeating incumbent mayor Raymond Alvin Garcia, former mayor Mike Rama, and two other candidates. Rama has served as a mayor for over 9 years, having been first elected into the position in 2010 to 2016, and served again in 2021 after the death of mayor Edgar Labella.

For Cebu City's House of Representatives election, in the first district, incumbent congresswoman Rachel Del Mar (NPC) was re-elected for a second term, defeating three other congressional candidates. On the other hand, in the second district, incumbent Eduardo Rama Jr. (Lakas–CMD) defeated BOPK-Independent candidate Rodrigo Abellanosa, winning another second term.

== Background ==
In 2021, after the death of former mayor Edgar Labella, then-vice mayor Michael Rama was assumed to his old post again as mayor. He would later again re-run for the mayorship, partnering with Cebu City councilor Raymond Alvin Garcia as his running mate, whom Rama competed against in the 2007 local elections for the vice-mayor post. Rama would later be reelected in the 2022 elections, giving him a full 3-year term along with his running mate Raymond Alvin Garcia.

In October 2024, months before the end of his term, Rama would later be suspended by the Office of the Ombudsman after he was found guilty of nepotism after employing his brother-in-law's as casual employees of the Cebu City Hall. Rama would later be disqualified from holding public office due to the nepotism case, thereby then-vice mayor Raymond Alvin Garcia assuming the mayorship and Cebu City councilor Dondon Hontiveros later assuming the vice-mayor post.

Despite his disqualification and suspension as mayor, Rama still opted to seek re-election, with Dondon Hontiveros as his running mate. Meanwhile, then-mayor Raymond Alvin Garcia also opted to rerun for the mayor post, choosing former Metro Cebu Water District chairman Joey Daluz as his vice-mayoral candidate. Then-Cebu City councilor Nestor Archival also filed his candidacy for mayor, with former Cebu City mayor Tomas Osmeña as his running mate.

== Tickets ==
Candidates italicized indicate incumbents seeking reelection.

=== Administration coalition ===
PFP-NPC-Aksyon/Kusug–Panaghiusa
Position	#	Candidate	Party
Mayor	3.	Raymond Alvin Garcia	PFP
Vice mayor	1.	Joey Daluz	PFP
Representative (1st district)	2.	Rachel del Mar	NPC
Representative (2nd district)	1.	Eduardo Rama Jr. (Note: Guest candidate)	Lakas
Councilor (1st district)	3.	Jun Alcover	PFP
Councilor (1st district)	8.	Glena Bontuyan	PFP
Councilor (1st district)	12.	Joel Garganera	PFP
Councilor (1st district)	13.	Harold Kendrick Go	PFP
Councilor (1st district)	15.	Ailien Guardo	PFP
Councilor (1st district)	19.	Edgardo-Jaypee Labella	PFP
Councilor (1st district)	25.	RJ Osmeña	PFP
Councilor (1st district)	27.	Winston Pepito	PFP
Councilor (2nd district)	2.	Pie Abella	PFP
Councilor (2nd district)	6.	Opel Abellanosa	PFP
Councilor (2nd district)	17.	James Cuenco	PFP
Councilor (2nd district)	21.	Rey Gealon	PFP
Councilor (2nd district)	22.	Jeson Guardo	PFP
Councilor (2nd district)	25.	Eugene Labella	PFP
Councilor (2nd district)	31.	Renato Osmeña	PFP
Councilor (2nd district)	36.	Dave Tumulak	Aksyon

=== Opposition coalitions ===
PDP-Lakas-LDP/Partido Barug BagOng Sugbo
Position	#	Candidate	Party
Mayor	4.	Mike Rama	Partido Barug
Vice mayor	2.	Dondon Hontiveros	Partido Barug
Representative (1st district)	4.	Franklyn Ong	LDP
Representative (2nd district)	2.	Eduardo Rama Jr.	Lakas
Councilor (1st district)	2.	Mae-Anne Aguipo	Lakas
Councilor (1st district)	7.	Titing Biton	Lakas
Councilor (1st district)	16.	Ernesto Herrera II	Lakas
Councilor (1st district)	9.	Maria Pino Buanghug	Partido Barug
Councilor (1st district)	20.	Rey Lauron	Lakas
Councilor (1st district)	23.	Rex Millan	LDP
Councilor (1st district)	30.	Jessica Resch	Lakas
Councilor (1st district)	32.	Noel Wenceslao	Lakas
Councilor (2nd district)	3.	Nobie Abella-Cabatino	Lakas
Councilor (2nd district)	8.	Ramon Alcoseba	Lakas
Councilor (2nd district)	10.	Gremar Barete	Lakas
Councilor (2nd district)	18.	Harry Eran	Lakas
Councilor (2nd district)	19.	Francis Esparis	Lakas
Councilor (2nd district)	32.	Joy Pesquera	Lakas
Councilor (2nd district)	33.	Mikel Rama	Partido Barug
Councilor (2nd district)	38.	Phillip Zafra	Lakas

Liberal-Akbayan/BOPK
Position	#	Candidate	Party
Mayor	1.	Nestor Archival	Liberal
Vice mayor	3.	Tomas Osmeña	Liberal
Representative (1st district)	1.	Mary Ann de los Santos	Liberal
Representative (2nd district)	1.	Rodrigo Abellanosa	Independent
Councilor (1st district)	4.	Bebs Andales	Liberal
Councilor (1st district)	5.	Nice Archival	Liberal
Councilor (1st district)	6.	Alvin Arcilla	Liberal
Councilor (1st district)	10.	Jijing Candungog	Liberal
Councilor (1st district)	11.	Alvin Dizon	Akbayan
Councilor (1st district)	14.	Mac Gordon	Liberal
Councilor (1st district)	18.	Boy Labella	Liberal
Councilor (1st district)	22.	Mat Eric Medalle	Liberal
Councilor (2nd district)	1.	Michelle Abella	Liberal
Councilor (2nd district)	5.	Jose Abellanosa	Liberal
Councilor (2nd district)	7.	Raf Alcoseba	Liberal
Councilor (2nd district)	13.	Robert "Bobcab" Cabarrubias	Liberal
Councilor (2nd district)	20.	Jun "Jungabs" Gabuya	Liberal
Councilor (2nd district)	26.	Paul Labra	Liberal
Councilor (2nd district)	28.	Boyet Ocampo	Liberal
Councilor (2nd district)	30.	Ian Osmeña	Liberal

Partido Cebuano
Position	#	Candidate	Party
Mayor	1.	Yogi Ruiz	KBL
Councilor (1st district)	17.	Niceforo Iroy	KBL
Councilor (1st district)	26.	Lary Otadoy	KBL
Councilor (1st district)	29.	Ren Ranche	Independent
Councilor (2nd district)	9.	Bonel Balingit	KBL
Councilor (2nd district)	11.	Susan Jaca Berido	Independent
Councilor (2nd district)	12.	Vic Buendia	Independent
Councilor (2nd district)	24.	Omar Kintanar	KBL
Councilor (2nd district)	27.	Emman Maranga	KBL
Councilor (2nd district)	29.	Renil Oliva	KBL
Councilor (2nd district)	34.	Arlene Salahuddin	KBL

=== Other candidates ===
Candidates not in tickets
Position	#	Candidate	Party
Mayor	2.	Julieto Co	Independent
Representative (1st district)	3.	Bert Lerios	Independent
Councilor (1st district)
Councilor (1st district)	1.	Edgar Aballe	PRP
Councilor (1st district)	21.	Niña Mabatid	Aksyon
Councilor (1st district)	24.	Gyle Ombajin	Independent
Councilor (1st district)	28.	Mike Ralota	Independent
Councilor (1st district)	31.	Kevin Anthony Sanchez	Independent
Councilor (2nd district)	4.	Win-Win Abellana	Independent
Councilor (2nd district)	14.	Ali Cabido	Independent
Councilor (2nd district)	15.	Yvonne Cania	PRP
Councilor (2nd district)	16.	Jerone Castillo	Independent
Councilor (2nd district)	23.	Rom Regala Gutobat	Independent
Councilor (2nd district)	35.	Aldem Tello	Independent
Councilor (2nd district)	37.	Abdon Verdida Jr.	Independent

== Mayoralty and vice mayoralty elections ==
=== Mayor ===
Candidate	Party	Votes	%
Nestor Archival	Liberal Party	256,197	43.86
Raymond Alvin Garcia (incumbent)	Partido Federal ng Pilipinas	176,967	30.30
Mike Rama	Partido Barug	120,124	20.57
Yogi Ruiz	Kilusang Bagong Lipunan	27,652	4.73
Julieto Co	Independent	3,163	0.54
Total		584,103	100.00
Liberal gain from Partido Federal ng Pilipinas			

=== Vice mayor ===
Candidate	Party	Votes	%
Tomas Osmeña	Liberal Party	233,906	40.90
Dondon Hontiveros (incumbent)	Partido Barug	190,586	33.33
Joey Daluz	Partido Federal ng Pilipinas	147,343	25.77
Total		571,835	100.00
Liberal gain from Partido Barug			

== District representatives ==
=== Cebu City's 1st district ===
Incumbent Rachel del Mar (Nationalist People's Coalition) ran for a second term. She was previously elected in 2022 with 45.99% of the vote and a 50,350 vote (20.65%) margin over her closest opponent.

Del Mar ran against three other candidates, including Cebu City councilor Mary Ann de los Santos (BOPK-Liberal) and Cebu City Liga ng mga Barangay president Franklyn Ong (Laban ng Demokratikong Pilipino). Both Del Mar and Ong ran under BOPK in the previous elections, with Del Mar defecting from her late father Raul's longtime party (BOPK), in favor of incumbent mayor Garcia's Kugi Uswag Sugbo.

Del Mar won re-election, albeit with a decreased margin of 23,876 votes (9.56%), over second-placer Ong.

2025 Philippine House of Representatives election in the 1st District of Cebu City
Party	Candidate	Votes	%
NPC	Rachel del Mar (incumbent)	105,581	42.26
LDP	Franklyn Ong	81,705	32.70
Liberal	Mary Ann de los Santos	60,282	24.12
Independent	Bert Lerios	2,257	0.90
Total votes		249,825	100%
Margin of victory		23,876	9.56
NPC hold			

=== Cebu City's 2nd district ===
Incumbent Eduardo "Edu" Rama Jr. (Lakas–CMD) ran for a second term. He was first elected in 2022 under PDP–Laban with 54.43% of the vote and a 25,615 vote (8.78%) margin over opponent BG Rodrigo Abellanosa, Rodrigo Abellanosa's son.

Rama is running against former representative Rodrigo Abellanosa (BOPK-Independent). Rama, a candidate for Partido Barug BagOng Sugbo coalition, is also adopted by the Kusug–Panaghiusa coalition as a guest candidate.

Rama won re-election with an increased margin of 49,332 votes (15.78%) over Abellanosa.

2025 Philippine House of Representatives election in the 2nd District of Cebu City
Party	Candidate	Votes	%
Lakas	Eduardo Rama Jr. (incumbent)	181,055	57.89
Independent	Rodrigo Abellanosa	131,723	42.11
Total votes		312,778	100%
Margin of victory		49,332	15.78
Lakas hold			

== City Council elections ==
Party or alliance		Votes	%	Seats
Kusug–Panaghiusa	Partido Federal ng Pilipinas	1,148,852	30.97	5
Kusug–Panaghiusa	Aksyon Demokratiko	127,574	3.44	1
Kusug–Panaghiusa	Total	1,276,426	34.41	6
Bando Osmeña – Pundok Kauswagan	Liberal Party	1,183,618	31.91	6
Bando Osmeña – Pundok Kauswagan	Akbayan	82,428	2.22	0
Bando Osmeña – Pundok Kauswagan	Total	1,266,046	34.13	6
Partido Barug BagOng Sugbo	Lakas–CMD	653,281	17.61	3
Partido Barug BagOng Sugbo	Partido Barug	126,835	3.42	1
Partido Barug BagOng Sugbo	Laban ng Demokratikong Pilipino	22,001	0.59	0
Partido Barug BagOng Sugbo	Total	802,117	21.62	4
People's Reform Party		80,772	2.18	0
Kilusang Bagong Lipunan		72,276	1.95	0
Aksyon Demokratiko		66,465	1.79	0
Independent		145,432	3.92	0
Ex officio seats				2
Total		3,709,534	100.00	18

=== 1st district ===
Cebu City's 1st councilor district consists of the same area as Cebu City's 1st legislative district. Eight councilors are elected from this councilor district.

31 candidates were included in the ballot.

Candidate	Party	Votes	%
Winston Pepito	Partido Federal ng Pilipinas	113,179	6.76
Nice Archival	Liberal Party	105,542	6.31
Harold Kendrick Go	Partido Federal ng Pilipinas	98,052	5.86
Edgardo Labella (incumbent)	Partido Federal ng Pilipinas	96,972	5.79
Joel Garganera (incumbent)	Partido Federal ng Pilipinas	94,194	5.63
Alvin Arcilla	Liberal Party	93,156	5.57
Jun Alcover (incumbent)	Partido Federal ng Pilipinas	84,570	5.05
Bebs Andales	Liberal Party	83,670	5.00
Alvin Dizon	Akbayan	82,428	4.93
Boy Labella	Liberal Party	82,101	4.91
Niña Mabatid	Aksyon Demokratiko	66,465	3.97
RJ Osmeña	Partido Federal ng Pilipinas	63,780	3.81
Ailien Guardo	Partido Federal ng Pilipinas	63,576	3.80
Noel Wenceslao (incumbent)	Lakas–CMD	63,066	3.77
Glena Bontuyan	Partido Federal ng Pilipinas	60,413	3.61
Mac Gordon	Liberal Party	54,444	3.25
Mat Eric Medalle	Liberal Party	51,022	3.05
Jijing Candungog	Liberal Party	47,181	2.82
Ernesto Herrera II	Partido Federal ng Pilipinas	39,577	2.36
Rey Lauron	Lakas–CMD	37,605	2.25
Maria Buanghug	Partido Barug	31,988	1.91
Jessica Resch	Lakas–CMD	31,437	1.88
Titing Biton	Lakas–CMD	23,745	1.42
Edgar Aballe	People's Reform Party	23,149	1.38
Mae Anne Aguipo	Lakas–CMD	22,371	1.34
Rex Millan	Laban ng Demokratikong Pilipino	22,001	1.31
Ren Ranche	Independent	9,295	0.56
Lary Otadoy	Kilusang Bagong Lipunan	8,882	0.53
Mike Ralota	Independent	8,688	0.52
Niceforo Iroy	Kilusang Bagong Lipunan	5,710	0.34
Gyle Ombajin	Independent	5,233	0.31
Total		1,673,492	100.00

=== 2nd district ===
Cebu City's 2nd councilor district consists of the same area as Cebu City's 2nd legislative district. Eight councilors are elected from this councilor district.

38 candidates were included in the ballot.

Candidate	Party	Votes	%
Dave Tumulak	Aksyon Demokratiko	127,574	6.00
Phillip Zafra (incumbent)	Lakas–CMD	108,520	5.11
Paul Labra	Liberal Party	107,270	5.05
Jose Abellanosa (incumbent)	Liberal Party	101,088	4.76
Mikel Rama	Partido Barug	94,847	4.46
Francis Esparis (incumbent)	Lakas–CMD	93,500	4.40
Michelle Abella	Liberal Party	90,061	4.24
Harry Eran	Lakas–CMD	90,048	4.24
Joy Pesquera (incumbent)	Lakas–CMD	89,177	4.20
Jungabs Gabuya	Liberal Party	89,048	4.19
Rey Gealon (incumbent)	Partido Federal ng Pilipinas	81,565	3.84
Ian Osmeña	Liberal Party	79,544	3.74
Bobcab Cabarrubias	Liberal Party	75,279	3.54
Pie Abella	Partido Federal ng Pilipinas	73,952	3.48
Eugene Labella	Partido Federal ng Pilipinas	73,428	3.46
Gremar Barete	Lakas–CMD	70,073	3.30
Raf Alcoseba	Liberal Party	69,744	3.28
Nobie Abella-Cabatino	Lakas–CMD	61,304	2.88
Renato Osmeña (incumbent)	Partido Federal ng Pilipinas	60,770	2.86
Yvonne Cania	People's Reform Party	57,623	2.71
James Cuenco (incumbent)	Partido Federal ng Pilipinas	56,695	2.67
Boyet Ocampo	Liberal Party	54,468	2.56
Vic Buendia	Independent	52,595	2.47
Ramon Alcoseba	Lakas–CMD	51,612	2.43
Jeson Guardo	Partido Federal ng Pilipinas	45,208	2.13
Opel Abellanosa	Partido Federal ng Pilipinas	42,921	2.02
Jerone Castillo	Independent	23,518	1.11
Bonel Balingit	Kilusang Bagong Lipunan	21,594	1.02
Win-Win Abellana	Independent	12,868	0.61
Omar Kintanar	Kilusang Bagong Lipunan	11,547	0.54
Susan Jaca Berido	Independent	9,677	0.46
Emman Maranga	Kilusang Bagong Lipunan	9,438	0.44
Ali Cabido	Independent	8,611	0.41
Arlene Salahuddin	Kilusang Bagong Lipunan	7,931	0.37
Renil Oliva	Kilusang Bagong Lipunan	7,174	0.34
Rom Regala Gutobat	Independent	5,386	0.25
Abdon Verdida Jr.	Independent	4,980	0.23
Aldem Tello	Independent	4,581	0.22
Total		2,125,219	100.00
