= 2022 Cebu City local elections =

Election in Cebu City, Philippines on 2022

2022 Cebu City mayoral election
- May 9, 2022
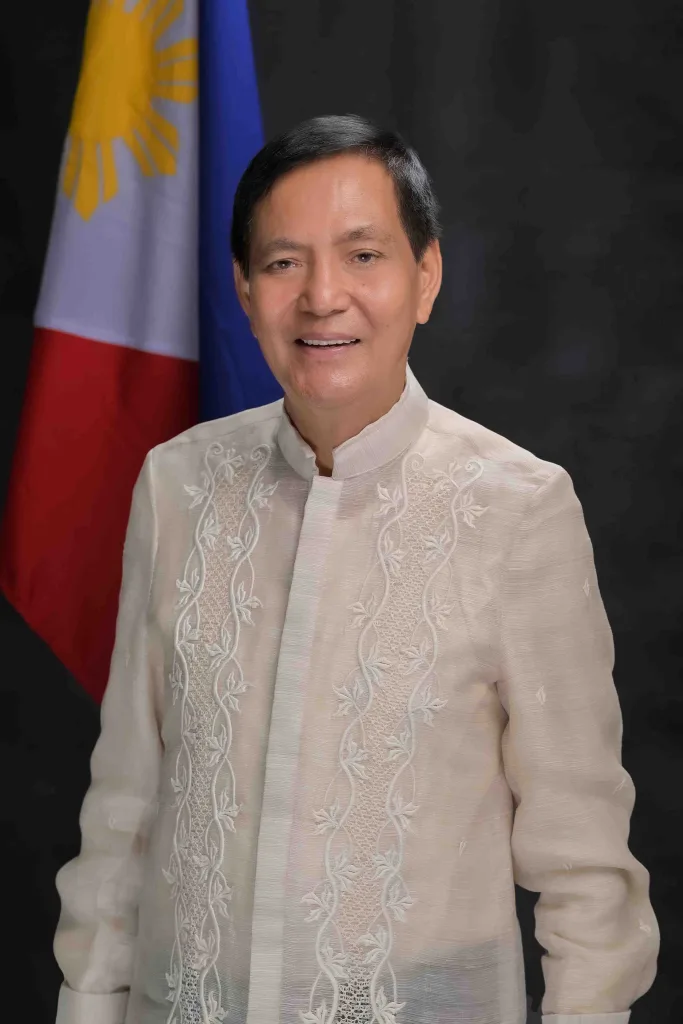

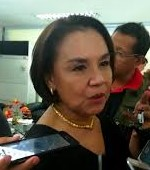
			IND
Nominee	Michael Rama	Margarita Osmeña	David Tumulak
Party	PDP–Laban	LDP	Independent
Running mate	Raymond Alvin Garcia	Franklyn Ong
Popular vote	239,656	202,446	141,225
Percentage	40.85	34.50	24.07
Mayor before election
Michael Rama
Barug
PDP–Laban
Elected Mayor
Michael Rama
Barug
PDP–Laban
- Vice mayoral election
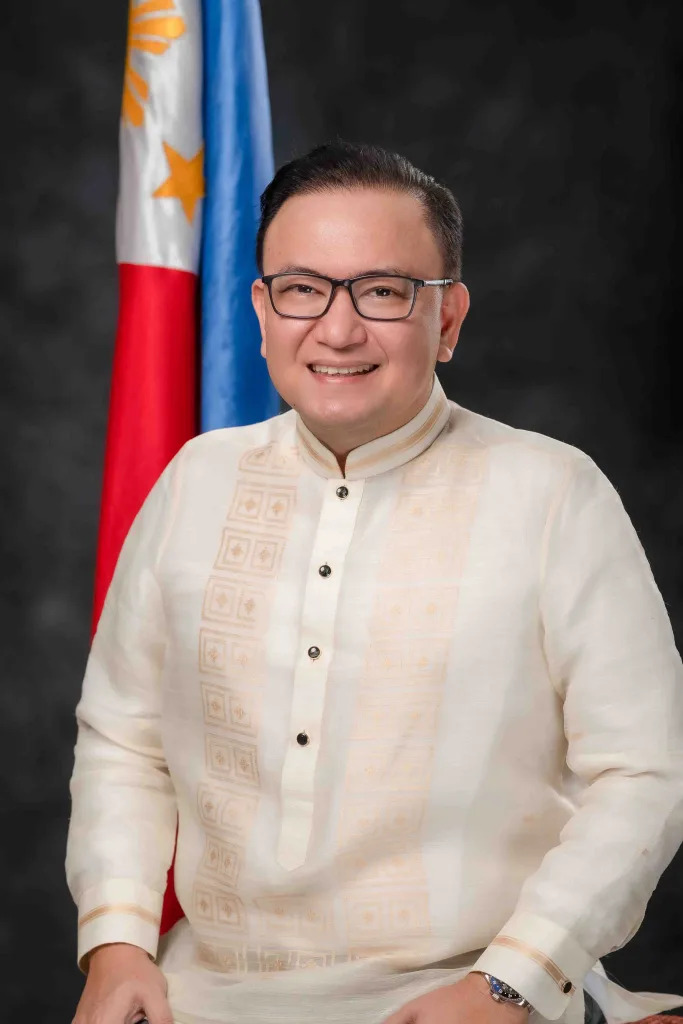

Candidate	Raymond Alvin Garcia	Franklyn Ong	Bimbo Fernandez
Party	PDP–Laban	LDP	Liberal
Popular vote	283,235	222,722	36,444
Percentage	52.21%	41.06%	6.71%
Vice Mayor before election
Dondon Hontiveros
Barug
PDP–Laban
Elected Vice Mayor
Raymond Alvin Garcia
Barug
PDP–Laban

Local elections were held in Cebu City on May 9, 2022 within the Philippine general election. Registered voters of the city elected their mayor, vice mayor, district representatives, and city council members. The mayor and vice mayor were elected in separate first-past-the-post votes. While for the legislative branch, Cebu City is divided into two districts wherein the constituents of each district elected a congressional representative (through first-past-the-post voting) and eight regular city council members (through multi-member plurality voting).

Incumbent mayor Mike Rama (Barug-PDP–Laban) won a full term by defeating former acting mayor Margot Osmeña (BO–PK-LDP) and four other independent candidates. Rama, who was elected vice mayor in 2019, ascended to the mayorship upon the death of Mayor Edgardo Labella in 2021. Rama also previously served two consecutive terms as mayor from 2010 to 2016. Rama's running mate, councilor Raymond Alvin Garcia (KUSUG/PDP–Laban), was elected vice mayor by defeating Osmeña's running mate, councilor Franklyn Ong.

In the Cebu City Council, Rama's ticket composed of Barug-PDP–Laban, KUSUG, and three independents won twelve seats (five seats in the 1st district and seven in the 2nd district). Meanwhile, Osmeña's BO–PK-LDP ticket garnered the remaining four seats (three seats in the 1st district and one in the 2nd district) down from the eight they held in the outgoing term.

For Cebu City's House of Representatives seats: in the 1st district, Rachel del Mar (NPC) was elected for a second non-consecutive term to the seat vacated by her father, Raul del Mar, who died in office back in 2020. Meanwhile, in the 2nd district, councilor Eduardo "Edu" Rama Jr. (PDP–Laban), Mike Rama's nephew, defeated LDP's nominee BG Rodrigo Abellanosa, son of the term-limited incumbent Rodrigo Abellanosa.

The elected officials assumed their respective offices on June 30, 2022 and are expected to each serve a three-year term until June 30, 2025.

== Background ==
Prior to his death on November 19, 2021, then mayor Edgardo Labella chose not to seek re-election in 2022, paving the way for then vice mayor Michael Rama to seek a return to his old post as mayor. Rama, who previously served as mayor from 2010 to 2016, teamed up with incumbent city councilor Raymond Alvin Garcia as his candidate for vice mayor whom he competed against for the position of vice mayor in 2007 but has since become allies when the latter's political party KUSUG endorsed Rama's re-election in 2013.

Margarita Osmeña, a former city councilor and wife of former mayor Tomas Osmeña, has also decided to throw her hat into the mayoral race together with incumbent city councilor Franklyn Ong as her candidate for vice mayor. Ong is currently serving as Kasambagan barangay captain and as ex officio member of the Cebu City Council representing the Liga ng mga Barangay - Cebu City Chapter. Osmeña has previously served as acting mayor from May 17, 2016 to June 30, 2016 with the suspension of then mayor Rama. If elected, Osmeña will be the first woman mayor of the city.

Several personalities have also filed their candidacies such as incumbent city councilor David Tumulak as mayor, former city administrator Bimbo Fernandez as vice mayor, actor and businessman Richard Yap as representative of Cebu City's 1st congressional district, and former mayor Tomas Osmeña as representative of Cebu City's 2nd congressional district. However, Osmeña withdrew his candidacy days before the substitution deadline and was replaced by BG Rodrigo Abellanosa, son of Rodrigo Abellanosa.

== Term-limited and retiring incumbents ==
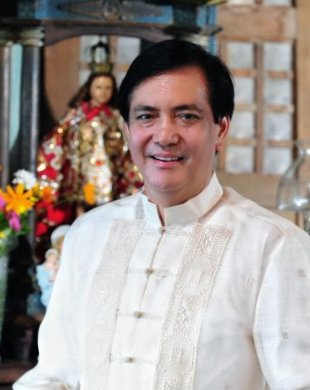
Michael Rama

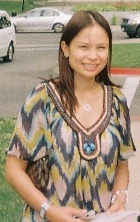
Rachel del Mar

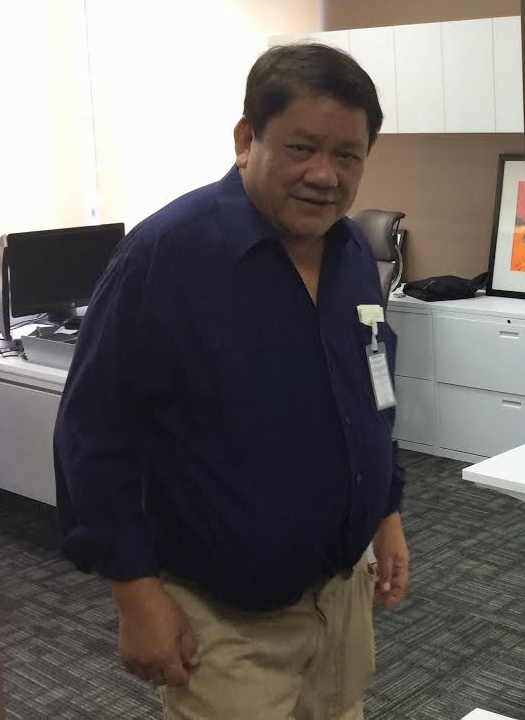
Tomas Osmeña

The following are "third-termers", who are term limited.

=== Congressional representative ===
- Rodrigo Abellanosa (BOPK/LDP)

=== Councilors ===
- David Tumulak (BARUG/Nacionalista)
- Eugenio Gabuya Jr. (BOPK/LDP)

== Candidates ==
=== Official candidates ===
The Commission on Elections is expected to publish a final list of accepted candidates by early 2022.

=== Filed certificates of candidacies ===
The following have filed certificates of candidacies, formally notifying the commission that they are running.

==== Mayor ====
October 4

- Edgar Concha Jr. (Independent), call center agent

October 7

- Margarita Osmeña (BOPK/LDP), former city councilor, term limited in 2019
- Crisologo Saavedra Jr. (Independent), businessman
- David Tumulak (Independent), incumbent city councilor

October 8

- Jose Layon (Reporma)
- Juanito Luna (Independent)
- Michael Rama (BARUG/PDP–Laban), incumbent vice mayor and former mayor

==== Vice Mayor ====
October 4

- Bimbo Fernandez (Liberal Party), former undersecretary of interior and local government and former city administrator
  - Fernandez was initially endorsed by a group of non-government organizations to run for mayor but opted to run for vice mayor.

October 5

- Franklyn Ong (BOPK/LDP), incumbent city councilor and president of Liga ng mga Barangay - Cebu City Chapter

October 8

- Raymond Alvin Garcia (KUSUG/PDP–Laban), incumbent city councilor

==== 1st District Representative ====
October 3

- Richard Yap (NUP), actor and businessman, lost election in 2019

October 5

- Rachel del Mar (BOPK/NPC), former representative of Cebu City's 1st congressional district

October 8

- Prisca Niña Mabatid (BARUG/PDP–Laban), incumbent city councilor
- Manuel Momongan (Independent)
- Avenescio Piramide (Lakas–CMD)

==== 2nd District Representative ====
October 8

- Eduardo Rama Jr. (BARUG/PDP-Laban), incumbent city councilor

==== 1st District Representative ====
October 1

- Gian Aznar (PROMDI), former seafarer and teacher

October 5

- Lea Ouano-Japson (PROMDI/LDP), incumbent city councilor
- Winston Pepito (Reporma), incumbent Bacayan barangay councilor
- Joy Augustus Young (BOPK/LDP), incumbent city councilor and former vice mayor

October 7

- Sisinio Andales (BOPK/LDP), former city councilor
- Nestor Archival (BOPK/LDP), incumbent city councilor
- Alvin Arcilla (BOPK/LDP), former city councilor
- Arturo Barrit (BOPK/LDP), spokesperson of Associated Labor Union-Trade Union Congress of the Philippines (ALU-TUCP)
- Alvin Dizon (BOPK/LDP), incumbent city councilor

October 8

- Pastor Alcover Jr. (BARUG/PDP–Laban), former city councilor, lost re-election in 2019
- Maria Buanghug (BARUG/PDP–Laban), vendors group leader
- Mary Ann de los Santos (BOPK/LDP), former city councilor
- Roland Empleo (Katipunan ng Kamalayang Kayumanggi)
- Joel Garganera (Independent), incumbent city councilor
- Jerry Guardo (BARUG/PDP–Laban), incumbent city councilor
- Edwin Jagmoc (Independent), former city councilor
- Emmanuel Labella (Independent), brother of mayor Edgardo Labella
- Edgardo Labella II (BARUG/PDP–Laban), son of mayor Edgardo Labella, lost election in 2016
- Reynald Lauron (PANAGHIUSA/Aksyon Demokratiko), incumbent Cambinocot barangay captain
- Melvin Legaspi (BARUG/PDP–Laban), lawyer
- Peter Mancao (BARUG/PDP–Laban), deputy task force leader of the city's Covid-19 vaccine rollout
- Noel Eleuterio Wenceslao (BARUG/PDP–Laban), former city councilor, lost re-election in 2016

==== 2nd District Councilor ====
October 5

- Raul Alcoseba (BOPK/LDP), incumbent city councilor

October 6

- Alejandro Cabido (Independent)
- Janet Calleno (Independent)

October 7

- Josephine Abella-Maglasang (BOPK/LDP), sister of the late Atty. Amay Abella
- Gremar Barete (BOPK/LDP), incumbent Buhisan barangay captain
- Roberto Cabarrubias (BOPK/LDP), former city councilor
- Cornelio Jaca (BOPK/LDP), retired Municipal Trial Courts in Cities judge
- Omar Kintanar (BOPK/LDP), incumbent Cogon Pardo barangay councilor
- Ana Gabriela Beatriz Osmeña (BOPK/LDP), daughter-in-law of former mayor Tomas Osmeña

October 8

- Raymundo Crystal (PANAGHIUSA)
- James Anthony Cuenco (BARUG/PDP–Laban), incumbent city councilor
  - Assumed office on September 15, 2020 to replace his father, Antonio Cuenco.
- Alan Dinampo (Katipunan ng Kamalayang Kayumanggi)
- Harry Eran (BARUG/PDP–Laban), incumbent Cogon Pardo barangay captain
- Pancrasio Esparis (BARUG/PDP–Laban), incumbent Quiot barangay captain
- Rey Gealon (BARUG/PDP–Laban), incumbent city legal officer
- Donaldo Hontiveros (Independent), incumbent city councilor
- Renato Osmeña Jr. (BARUG/PDP–Laban), incumbent city councilor
- Samuel Panilagao (Independent)
- Jocelyn Pesquera (BARUG/PDP-Laban), former city councilor
- Simeon Romarate (PANAGHIUSA), incumbent Division for the Welfare of the Urban Poor (DWUP) head
- Phillip Zafra (Independent), incumbent city councilor

=== Candidates who withdrew ===
These are the candidates who have filed candidacies, but later withdrew:

- Michael Bantasan (NUP)
  - On October 8, Bantasan filed to run for representative of Cebu City's 2nd congressional district. On October 12, Bantasan withdrew his candidacy.
- Tomas Osmeña (BOPK/LDP), former mayor
  - On October 7, Osmeña filed to run for representative of Cebu City's 2nd congressional district. On November 12, Osmeña withdrew his candidacy and was substituted by BG Rodrigo Abellanosa, son of Rodrigo Abellanosa.
- Michael Matañoza (PROMDI)
  - On October 8, Matañoza filed to run for mayor of Cebu City. On November 15, Matañoza withdrew his candidacy.
- Clifford Jude Niñal (BOPK/LDP), incumbent San Nicolas Proper barangay captain
  - On October 7, Niñal filed to run for 2nd district councilor of Cebu City. On November 15, Niñal withdrew his candidacy and was substituted by Jose Lorenzo Abellanosa, son of Rodrigo Abellanosa.

=== Declined to be candidates ===
==== For mayor ====
- Rodrigo Abellanosa (BOPK/LDP), incumbent representative of Cebu City's 2nd congressional district
  - Abellanosa considered running for city mayor but ultimately gave way to Margarita Osmeña.
- Chuck Barandog, police official
- Tomas Osmeña (BOPK/LDP), former mayor and former representative of Cebu City's 2nd congressional district

==== For 1st District representative ====
- Mary Ann de los Santos (BOPK/LDP), former city councilor
  - De los Santos, who unsuccessfully ran for vice mayor in 2019, opted to run for city councilor.
- Mariano Osmeña (PROMDI), businessman

==== For 2nd District representative ====
- Jocelyn Pesquera (BARUG/PDP-Laban), former city councilor
  - Pesquera, who unsuccessfully ran for representative of Cebu City's 2nd congressional district in 2019, opted to run for city councilor.

==== For 1st District councilor ====
- Garry Lao, former Cebu City Office for Substance Abuse Prevention head and incumbent City of Lapu-Lapu Office for Substance Abuse Prevention head

==== For 2nd District councilor ====
- Gerardo Carillo, former city councilor
- Jessica Resch, incumbent Sangguniang Kabataan Federation - Cebu City president

=== Non-candidates ===
- Antonio Cuenco (BARUG/PDP–Laban) – Died on June 27, 2020.
  - Served his first term as Cebu City councilor.
- Raul del Mar (BOPK/Liberal) – Died on November 16, 2020.
  - Served his third and last term as representative of Cebu City's 1st District.
- Edgardo Labella (BARUG/PDP–Laban) – Died on November 19, 2021.
  - Did not seek re-election for mayor of Cebu City.

== Opinion polling ==
Mayoralty elections
Fieldwork date(s)	Pollster	Sample size	MoE	Concha Ind.	Luna Ind.	Osmeña LDP	Rama PDP–Laban	Saavedra Ind.	Tumulak Ind.	Others	Und./ Ref.	None
Feb 14–21	RP-MDF	1,200	±3.0%	—	—	25	30	—	38	—	—	—
Apr 1–5	RP-MDF	1,200	±3.0%	—	—	37	22	—	34	—	7	—

== Mayoralty and vice mayoralty elections ==
=== Mayor ===
Margarita Osmeña, a former city councilor and wife of former mayor Tomas Osmeña, is challenging incumbent mayor Michael Rama for the position of mayor. Outgoing city councilor David Tumulak has also joined the race as an independent candidate.

Cebu City mayoral election
Party	Candidate	Votes	%
PDP–Laban	Michael Rama (incumbent)	239,656	40.85%
LDP	Margarita Osmeña	202,446	34.50%
Independent	David Tumulak	141,225	24.07%
Independent	Crisologo Saavedra Jr.	1,418	0.24%
Independent	Edgar Concha Jr.	1,133	0.19%
Independent	Juanito Luna	760	0.12%
Total votes		552,811	100%
Margin of victory		35,492	6.42%

=== Vice mayor ===
Incumbent city councilors Raymond Alvin Garcia and Franklyn Ong are competing for the position of vice mayor along with former city administrator Bimbo Fernandez.

Cebu City Vice mayoral election
Party	Candidate	Votes	%
PDP–Laban	Raymond Alvin Garcia	283,235	52.21%
LDP	Franklyn Ong	222,722	41.06%
Liberal	Bimbo Fernandez	36,444	6.71%
Total votes		511,029	100%
Margin of victory		57,250	11.20%

== District representatives ==
=== 1st District ===
2022 Cebu City's 1st congressional district election
- May 9, 2022
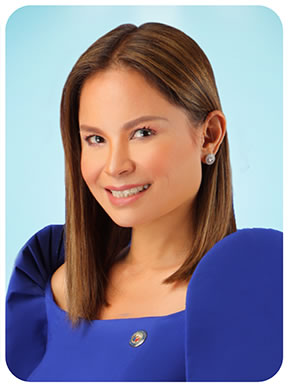
Candidate	Rachel del Mar	Prisca Niña Mabatid	Richard Yap
Party	NPC	PDP–Laban	NUP
Alliance	Alliances: Reporma–NPC (national); BO–PK (local)	Alliances: TAP (national); BARUG (local)	UniTeam (national)
Popular vote	117,512	64,447	52,982
Percentage	45.99%	25.22%	20.73%
Candidate	Avenescio Piramide
Party	Lakas
Alliance	UniTeam (national)
Popular vote	18,627
Percentage	7.29%
Philippine Representative before election
Vacant
Elected Philippine Representative
Rachel del Mar
NPC

Actor Richard Yap is running again as 1st district representative after losing to the late Raul del Mar in the 2019 elections. Yap will face off with former party mate and incumbent city councilor Prisca Niña Mabatid and del Mar's daughter Rachel, who previously served as the district's representative from 2010 to 2013.

2022 Philippine House of Representatives election in the 1st District of Cebu City
Party	Candidate	Votes	%
NPC	Rachel del Mar	117,512	45.99%
PDP–Laban	Prisca Niña Mabatid	64,447	25.22%
NUP	Richard Yap	52,982	20.73%
Lakas	Avenescio Piramide	18,627	7.29%
Independent	Manuel Momongan	1,929	0.75%
Total votes		243,785	100%
Margin of victory		50,350	20.65%

=== 2nd District ===
BG Rodrigo Abellanosa attempted to succeed his father, incumbent district representative Rodrigo Abellanosa. He lost to Eduardo Rama Jr., an incumbent city councilor and nephew of incumbent mayor Michael Rama.

2022 Philippine House of Representatives election in the 2nd District of Cebu City
Party	Candidate	Votes	%
PDP–Laban	Eduardo Rama Jr.	168,476	54.42%
LDP	BG Rodrigo Abellanosa	141,076	45.57%
Total votes		288,715	100%
Margin of victory		25,615	8.78%

== City Council elections ==
Party	Votes	%	Seats
Aksyon Demokratiko	38,082	1.02	0
Katipunan ng Kamalayang Kayumanggi	19,806	0.53	0
Laban ng Demokratikong Pilipino	1,359,369	36.56	4
Partido Demokratiko Pilipino-Lakas ng Bayan	1,466,240	39.43	9
Partido Panaghiusa	100,651	2.71	0
Partido para sa Demokratikong Reporma	65,945	1.77	0
Progressive Movement for the Devolution of Initiatives	121,061	3.26	0
Independent	547,401	14.72	3
Ex officio seats			2
Total	3,718,555	100.00	18

Incumbents are expressed in italics.

=== By ticket ===
==== Laban ng Demokratikong Pilipino/Bando Osmeña – Pundok Kauswagan ====
Cebu City North District (1st District)
#	Name	Party
2.	Sisinio Andales	LDP
3.	Nestor Archival	LDP
4.	Alvin Arcilla	LDP
6.	Arturo Barrit	LDP
8.	Mary Ann de los Santos	LDP
9.	Alvin Dizon	LDP
14.	Lea Ouano-Japson	PROMDI
22.	Joy Augustus Young	LDP

Cebu City South District (2nd District)
#	Name	Party
1.	Josephine Abella-Maglasang	LDP
2.	Jose Lorenzo Abellanosa	LDP
3.	Raul Alcoseba (Note: Died in office on April 23, 2022.)	LDP
4.	Gremar Barete	LDP
5.	Roberto Cabarrubias	LDP
15.	Cornelio Jaca	LDP
16.	Omar Kintanar	LDP
17.	Ana Gabriela Beatriz Osmeña	LDP

==== Partido Demokratiko Pilipino-Lakas ng Bayan/Partido Barug/Kugi Uswag Sugbo ====
Cebu City North District (1st District)
#	Name	Party
1.	Pastor Alcover Jr.	PDP–Laban
7.	Maria Buanghug	PDP–Laban
11.	Joel Garganera	Independent
12.	Jerry Guardo	PDP–Laban
16.	Edgardo Labella II	PDP–Laban
18.	Melvin Legaspi	PDP–Laban
19.	Peter Mancao	PDP–Laban
21.	Noel Eleuterio Wenceslao	PDP–Laban

Cebu City South District (2nd District)
#	Name	Party
9.	James Anthony Cuenco	PDP–Laban
11.	Harry Eran	PDP–Laban
12.	Pancrasio Esparis	PDP–Laban
13.	Rey Gealon	PDP–Laban
14.	Donaldo Hontiveros (Note: Guest candidate.)	Independent
18.	Renato Osmeña Jr.	PDP–Laban
20.	Jocelyn Pesquera	PDP–Laban
22.	Phillip Zafra	Independent

==== Aksyon Demokratiko ====
Cebu City North District (1st District)
#	Name	Party
17.	Reynald Lauron	Aksyon

==== Katipunan ng Kamalayang Kayumanggi ====
Cebu City North District (1st District)
#	Name	Party
10.	Ronald Empleo	Katipunan

Cebu City South District (2nd District)
#	Name	Party
10.	Alan Dinampo	Katipunan

==== Partido Panaghiusa ====
Cebu City South District (2nd District)
#	Name	Party
8.	Raymundo Crystal	Panaghiusa
21.	Simeon Romarate	Panaghiusa

==== Partido Para sa Demokratikong Reporma ====
Cebu City North District (1st District)
#	Name	Party
20.	Winston Pepito	Reporma

==== PROMDI ====
Cebu City North District (1st District)
#	Name	Party
5.	Gian Aznar	PROMDI

==== Independents ====
Independent Cebu City North District (1st District)
#	Name	Party
13.	Edwin Jagmoc	Independent
15.	Emmanuel Labella	Independent

Independent Cebu City South District (2nd District)
#	Name	Party
6.	Alejandro Cabido	Independent
7.	Janet Calleno	Independent
19.	Samuel Panilagao	Independent

=== By district ===
==== 1st District ====
- Key: Italicized: incumbent

City Council election at Cebu City's 1st district
Party	Candidate	Votes	%
LDP	Nestor Archival	125,485	7.21%
PDP–Laban	Jerry Guardo	116,937	6.72%
Independent	Joel Garganera	116,190	6.68%
PDP–Laban	Jaypee Labella	114,117	6.56%
LDP	Mary Ann De Los Santos	106,997	6.15%
LDP	Joy Young	105,791	6.08%
PDP–Laban	Noel Wenceslao	102,620	5.90%
PDP–Laban	Jun Alcover	102,137	5.87%
LDP	Alvin Arcilla	90,869	5.22%
PROMDI	Lea Ouano-Japson	90,622	5.21%
LDP	Bebs Andales	88,838	5.11%
LDP	Alvin Dizon	87,941	5.05%
PDP–Laban	Peter Mancao	83,527	4.80%
PDP–Laban	Melvin Legaspi	70,102	4.03%
Reporma	Winston Pepito	68,939	3.96%
PDP–Laban	Maria Pino Buanghug	61,058	3.51%
LDP	Arturo Barrit	46,945	2,70%
Independent	Doc Boy Labella	41,995	2.41%
Aksyon	Rey Lauron	39,696	2.28%
PROMDI	Gian Aznar	36,489	2.09%
Independent	Edwin Jagmoc	33,440	1.92%
Katipunan	Roy Empleo	7,484	0.43%
Total votes		1,657,769	100.00

==== 2nd District ====
- Key: Italicized: incumbent

City Council election at Cebu City's 2nd district
Party	Candidate	Votes	%
Independent	Dondon Hontiveros	191,938	9.02%
LDP	Jose Abellanosa	148,667	6.99%
PDP–Laban	Joy Pesquera	142,651	6.71%
Independent	Phillip Zafra	141,686	6.66%
PDP–Laban	JunJun Osmena	136,228	6.41%
PDP–Laban	James Anthony Cuenco	132,868	6.25%
PDP–Laban	Rey Gealon	123,387	5.80%
PDP–Laban	Francis Esparis	120,914	5.68%
PDP–Laban	Harry Eran	118,020	5.55%
LDP	Pie Abella	115,781	5.44%
LDP	Bobcab Cabbarrubias	114,397	5.38%
LDP	Bea Osmena	113,770	5.35%
LDP	Yayoy Alcoseba	107,280	5.04%
LDP	Gremar Barete	84,317	3.96%
LDP	Omar Ok Kintanar	78,684	3.70%
LDP	Judge Jack Jaca	75,974	3.57%
Panaghiusa	Simeon Romarate	60,152	2.82%
Panaghiusa	Gikom Crystal	47,819	2.24%
Independent	Janet Calleno	19,807	0.93%
Independent	Angkol Sam Panilagao	19,309	0.90%
Independent	Ali Cabido	18,396	0.86%
Katipunan	Alan Dinampo	13,570	0.63%
Total votes		1,849,838	100%
