= Bando Osmeña – Pundok Kauswagan =

Political party in the Philippines

- Abbreviation: BOPK
- Leader: Tomas Osmeña
- Founded: 1987
- National affiliation: Liberal (2009–2018; 2024–present); LDP (2018–2024); NPC (2021-2024); Lakas–CMD (2003–2009); PROMDI (1997–2003)
- Colors: Blue and yellow
- House of Representatives (Cebu City seats): 0 / 2
- City Mayor: 1 / 1
- City Vice Mayor: 1 / 1
- Cebu City Council: 6 / 16

Website
- Official website

Bando Osmeña – Pundok Kauswagan (lit. transl. Team Osmeña – Progress Group), commonly known as BO–PK or BOPK, is a local political party based in Cebu City, Philippines. It is a political party run by the Osmeña family of Cebu since 1987 when Tomas Osmeña first ran for mayor of Cebu City. Although not a registered political party with the Commission on Elections (COMELEC), it has been used by Osmeña and his allies since 1998 when he ran with Alvin Garcia as vice mayor.

== History ==
In 2012, then vice mayor Michael Rama bolted from the party and created his own group named as Barug Team Rama, which was later changed to Partido Barug upon its registration in COMELEC. Its formation has prevented BOPK from achieving its previous feats of landslide victories in 2007 and 2010 local elections when it was only competing with Kugi Uswag Sugbo of former Mayor Alvin Garcia.

from 2018 until 2024, It is affiliated with the Laban ng Demokratikong Pilipino. It was previously affiliated with the Liberal Party and Lakas-Christian-Muslim Democrats. Prior to that, it was the city's equivalent of another national party founded by another Osmeña scion, the Probinsya Muna Development Initiative.

In the 2019 elections, BOPK won eight seats in the Cebu City Council and two of its candidates for the House of Representatives namely Rodrigo Abellanosa and Raul del Mar.

BOPK has also supported national candidates specifically for the position of president and vice president. In the 2010 elections, then senators Noynoy Aquino and Mar Roxas were endorsed by the party for president and vice president, respectively. As Roxas sought for the presidency in 2016, the party supported his candidacy along with his vice presidential candidate, then representative of Camarines Sur's 3rd district Leni Robredo. However, there were some barangay officials allied with the party that junked Roxas in favor then Davao City mayor Rodrigo Duterte. Osmeña later revealed that while he supported Roxas, he also helped "protect" Duterte's vote in the city. The party supported Leni Robredo for president in the 2022 elections saying that they like "leaders who listen and respond", according to its mayoral candidate and Osmeña's wife, Margarita Osmeña, and senator Tito Sotto for vice president.

=== 2025 Elections ===
In 2024, BOPK nominated their candidates for the 2025 Cebu City local elections: first-ranked North (1st) District Councilor Nestor Archival for Mayor and former mayor Tomas Osmeña for Vice Mayor. Councilor Mary Ann De Los Santos was nominated as the party's congressional bet for the North (1st) District instead of Representative Rachel "Cutie" Del Mar, resulting in Del Mar defecting from BOPK in favor of incumbent Mayor Raymond Alvin Garcia's Kusug-Panaghiusa coalition. Former congressman Abellanosa was BOPK's congressional candidate for the South (2nd) District. The entire lineup, along with their candidates for city councilor from both districts, filed their certificates of candidacy on October 8, 2024, now once again affiliated with the Liberal Party as their national allies.

Throughout the campaign, surveys frequently showed Archival trailing far behind incumbent Garcia and, earlier in the campaign, behind former mayor Mike Rama as well. Archival cited a lack of funding and political machinery, with only 2 out of the city's 80 barangay captains supporting his candidacy.

On May 12, 2025, Archival emerged victorious as mayor in what was described as a "stunning upset". He attributed his victory to a grassroots-focused campaign, going directly to voters due to the absence of financial resources and institutional support. The COMELEC proclaimed Archival and other winning city officials early the next morning, May 13.

== Electoral performance ==
=== Mayor ===
| Election | Candidate | Number of votes | Share of votes | Outcome of election |
|---|---|---|---|---|
| 1988 | Tomas Osmeña | 120,704 | —N/a | Won |
| 1992 | Tomas Osmeña | 158,849 | —N/a | Won |
| 1995 | Alvin Garcia | 169,512 | —N/a | Won |
| 2001 | Tomas Osmeña | 128,754 | —N/a | Won |
| 2004 | Tomas Osmeña | 180,215 | —N/a | Won |
| 2007 | Tomas Osmeña | 195,236 | —N/a | Won |
| 2010 | Michael Rama | 210,520 | 58.42 | Won |
| 2013 | Tomas Osmeña | 209,497 | 49.30 | Lost |
| 2016 | Tomas Osmeña | 266,819 | 53.40 | Won |
| 2019 | Tomas Osmeña | 246,813 | 47.74 | Lost |
| 2022 | Margarita Osmeña | 202,446 | 34.50 | Lost |
| 2025 | Nestor Archival | 256,167 | 43.86 | Won |

=== Vice mayor ===
| Election | Candidate | Number of votes | Share of votes | Outcome of election |
|---|---|---|---|---|
| 2001 | Michael Rama | —N/a | —N/a | Won |
| 2004 | Michael Rama | 249,256 | —N/a | Won |
| 2007 | Michael Rama | 218,241 | —N/a | Won |
| 2010 | Joy Augustus Young | 226,736 | 66.25 | Won |
| 2013 | Joy Augustus Young | 200,200 | 49.95 | Lost |
| 2016 | Nestor Archival | 222,337 | 46.85 | Lost |
| 2019 | Mary Ann De Los Santos | 235,007 | 46.62 | Lost |
| 2022 | Franklyn Ong | 222,722 | 41.06 | Lost |
| 2025 | Tomas Osmeña | 233,906 | 40.90 | Won |

=== House of Representatives ===
==== Cebu City ====
| Election | Seats allocated | Outcome of election |
|---|---|---|
| 2001 | 2 / 2 | PROMDI-led coalition |
| 2004 | 2 / 2 | Lakas-led coalition |
| 2007 | 2 / 2 | Lakas-led coalition |
| 2010 | 2 / 2 | Liberal-led coalition |
| 2013 | 2 / 2 | Liberal-led coalition |
| 2016 | 2 / 2 | Liberal-led coalition |
| 2019 | 2 / 2 | LDP-led coalition |
| 2022 | 1 / 2 | LDP & NPC-led coalition |
| 2025 | 0 / 2 | Lost |

=== City council ===
| Election | Seats | Outcome of election |
|---|---|---|
| 2010 | 16 / 16 | Won |
| 2013 | 12 / 16 | Won |
| 2016 | 6 / 16 | Lost |
| 2019 | 8 / 16 | Tied with BARUG |
| 2022 | 4 / 16 | Lost |
| 2025 | 6 / 16 | Tied with KUSUG |

== Representatives to Congress ==
Cebu City Congressional Districts
| Period | 1st (North) District | 2nd (South) District |
|---|---|---|
| 8th Congress; 1987–1992 | Raul V. Del Mar | Antonio V. Cuenco |
| 9th Congress; 1992–1995 | Raul V. Del Mar | Antonio V. Cuenco |
| 10th Congress; 1995–1998 | Raul V. Del Mar | Antonio V. Cuenco |
| 11th Congress; 1998–2001 | Raoul B. del Mar | Nancy R. Cuenco |
| 12th Congress; 2001–2004 | Raul V. Del Mar | Antonio V. Cuenco |
| 13th Congress; 2004–2007 | Raul V. Del Mar | Antonio V. Cuenco |
| 14th Congress; 2007–2010 | Raul V. Del Mar | Antonio V. Cuenco |
| 15th Congress; 2010–2013 | Rachel Marguerite B. Del Mar | Tomas R. Osmeña |
| 16th Congress; 2013–2016 | Raul V. Del Mar (died in office on Nov. 6, 2020) | Rodrigo A. Abellanosa |
| 17th Congress; 2016–2019 | Raul V. Del Mar (died in office on Nov. 6, 2020) | Rodrigo A. Abellanosa |
| 18th Congress; 2019–2022 | Raul V. Del Mar (died in office on Nov. 6, 2020) | Rodrigo A. Abellanosa |
| 19th Congress; 2022–2025 | Rachel Marguerite B. Del Mar (defected to KUSUG in 2024) | None (lost to Eduardo Rama Jr. of Barug) |
| 20th Congress; 2022–2025 | None (lost to Rachel del Mar of KUSUG) | None (lost to Eduardo Rama Jr. of Barug) |

== See also ==
- Partido Barug
- Kugi Uswag Sugbo
- Partido Panaghiusa
