= 2013 Cebu City local elections =

Election in Cebu City, Philippines on 2013

2013 Cebu City mayoral election
- May 13, 2013
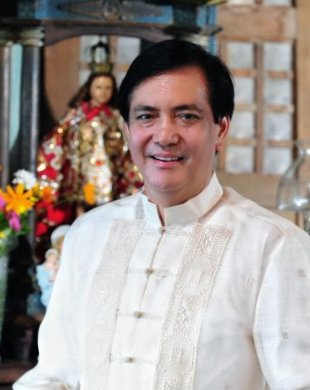

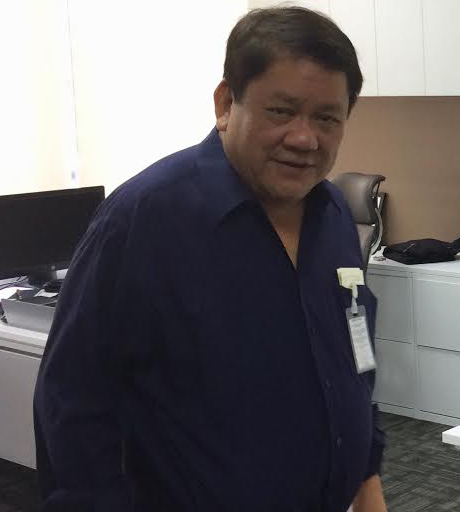
Nominee	Michael Rama	Tomas Osmeña
Party	UNA	Liberal
Running mate	Edgardo Labella	Joy Augustus Young
Popular vote	215,425	209,497
Percentage	50.70	49.30
Mayor before election
Michael Rama
Team Rama
UNA
Elected Mayor
Michael Rama
Team Rama
UNA
- Vice mayoral election
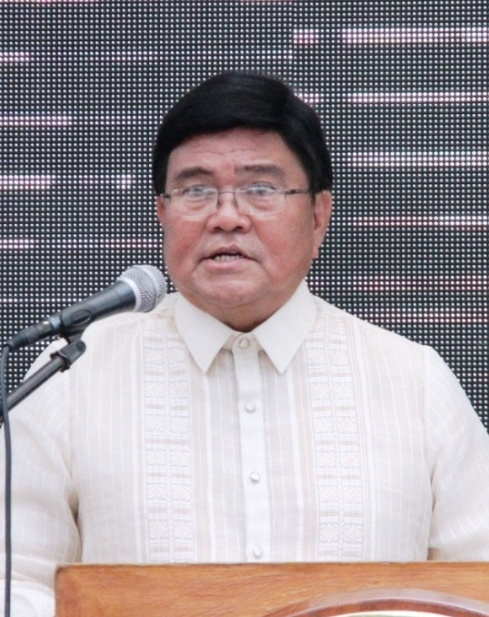

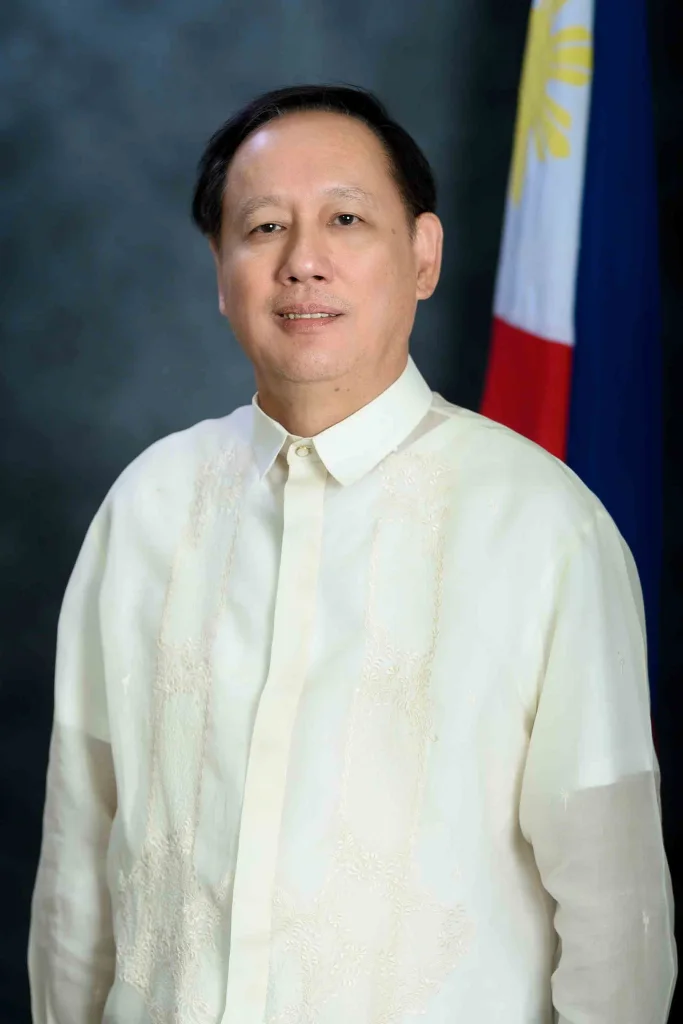
Candidate	Edgardo Labella	Joy Augustus Young
Party	UNA	Liberal
Popular vote	200,605	200,200
Percentage	50.05%	49.95%
Vice Mayor before election
Joy Augustus Young
BOPK
Liberal
Elected Vice Mayor
Edgardo Labella
Team Rama
UNA

Local elections were held in Cebu City on May 13, 2013 within the Philippine general election. Registered voters of the city elected candidates for the following elective local posts: mayor, vice mayor, district representatives, and eight councilors for each district—there are two legislative districts in the city.

== Mayoralty and vice mayoralty elections ==
=== Mayor ===
Michael Rama ran for his second term as the Mayor of Cebu City under his newly-formed group Team Rama facing off against his former partymate in Bando Osmeña – Pundok Kauswagan (BO–PK), Tomas Osmeña, whom he served with as vice mayor from 2001 to 2010. Rama went on to defeat Osmeña.

Cebu City mayoral election
Party	Candidate	Votes	%
UNA	Michael Rama (incumbent)	215,425	50.70
Liberal	Tomas Osmeña	209,497	49.30
Total votes		424,922	100.00
Margin of victory		5,928	1.40
UNA gain from Liberal			

=== Vice mayor ===
Joy Augustus Young ran for his second term as the Vice Mayor of Cebu City and was defeated by a slim margin against incumbent Cebu City Councilor for the North District Edgardo Labella, who also left BO–PK to join Rama's group. It was Labella's first time to run for the said position.

Cebu City Vice mayoral election
Party	Candidate	Votes	%
UNA	Edgardo Labella	200,605	50.05
Liberal	Joy Augustus Young (incumbent)	200,200	49.95
Total votes		400,805	100.00
Margin of victory		405	0.10
UNA gain from Liberal			

== District representatives ==
=== 1st District ===
Incumbent representative Rachel Marguerite del Mar, who was still eligible for a second term, decided against running for re-election to give way to her father Raul del Mar. The elder Del Mar defeated actress and talent manager Annabelle Rama.

2013 Philippine House of Representatives election in the 1st District of Cebu City
Party	Candidate	Votes	%
Liberal	Raul del Mar	133,149	74.55
UNA	Annabelle Rama	35,716	20.00
Independent	Marlo Maamo	7,092	3.97
Independent	Florencio Villarin	1,558	0.87
Independent	Don Navarro	442	0.25
Independent	Junex Doronio	353	0.20
Independent	Vic Mañalac	287	0.16
Total votes		178,597	100.00
Margin of victory		97,433	54.55
Liberal hold			

=== 2nd District ===
Incumbent representative Tomas Osmeña, who was still eligible for a second term, decided against running for re-election to reclaim his old post as Mayor of Cebu City. Incumbent Cebu City Councilor for the South District Rodrigo Abellanosa defeated lawyer Aristotle Batuhan.

2013 Philippine House of Representatives election in the 2nd District of Cebu City
Party	Candidate	Votes	%
Liberal	Rodrigo Abellanosa	123,757	55.54
UNA	Aristotle Batuhan	99,073	44.46
Total votes		222,830	100.00
Margin of victory		24,684	11.08
Liberal hold			

== City Council ==
Incumbents are expressed in italics.

=== By ticket ===
==== Liberal Party/Bando Osmeña-Pundok Kauswagan ====
Cebu City North District (1st District)
Name	Party
Nestor Archival	Liberal
Alvin Arcilla	Liberal
Sisinio Andales	Liberal
Ma. Nida Cabrera	Liberal
Alvin Dizon	Liberal
Lea Ouano-Japson	Liberal
Michael Ralota	Liberal
Noel Eleuterio Wenceslao	Liberal

Cebu City South District (2nd District)
Name	Party
Zenaida Amores	Liberal
Roberto Cabarrubias	Liberal
Gerardo Carillo	Liberal
Eugenio Gabuya Jr.	Liberal
Gabriel Leyson	Liberal
Margarita Osmeña	Liberal
Richard Osmeña	Liberal
Augustus "Jun" Pe Jr.	Liberal

==== United Nationalist Alliance/Team Rama ====
Cebu City North District (1st District)
Name	Party
Pastor "Jongjong" Alcover III	UNA
Mary Ann De Los Santos	UNA
Jerry Guardo	UNA
Sylvan "Jack" Jakosalem	UNA
Edwin Jagmoc Sr.	UNA
Bobby Vicente Kintanar	UNA
Felicisimo Rupinta	UNA
Eliodoro Sanchez	UNA

Cebu City South District (2nd District)
Name	Party
Nendell Hanz Abella	UNA
James Anthony Cuenco	UNA
Ronald "Raddy" Diola	UNA
Procopio Fernandez	UNA
Lutherlee "Lotlot" Ignacio-Soon	UNA
Altea Lim	UNA
David Tumulak	UNA
Tisha "Inday Tikay" Ylaya	UNA

==== Partido ng Manggagawa at Magsasaka ====
Cebu City South District (2nd District)
Name	Party
Federico Peredo	LM

==== Independent ====
Independent Cebu City South District (2nd District)
Name	Party
Samuel Atupan	Independent

=== By district ===
==== 1st District ====
- Key: Italicized: incumbent

City Council election at Cebu City's 1st district
Party	Candidate	Votes	%
Liberal	Nestor Archival	106,135	8.35
UNA	Mary Ann De Los Santos	101,134	7.96
Liberal	Alvin Arcilla	95,901	7.54
Liberal	Sisinio Andales	93,733	7.37
Liberal	Lea Ouano-Japson	90,353	7.11
Liberal	Alvin Dizon	85,011	6.69
Liberal	Ma. Nida Cabrera	83,110	6.54
Liberal	Noel Eleuterio Wenceslao	78,659	6.19
UNA	Jerry Guardo	77,378	6.09
UNA	Sylvan "Jack" Jakosalem	77,368	6.09
UNA	Edwin Jagmoc Sr.	68,224	5.37
Liberal	Michael Ralota	66,235	5.21
UNA	Pastor "Jongjong" Alcover III	64,943	5.11
UNA	Felicisimo Rupinta	62,496	4.92
UNA	Eliodoro Sanchez	62,141	4.89
UNA	Bobby Vicente Kintanar	58,479	4.60
Total votes		1,271,300	100.00

==== 2nd District ====
- Key: Italicized: incumbent

City Council election at Cebu City's 2nd district
Party	Candidate	Votes	%
Liberal	Margarita Osmeña	123,107	6.62
Liberal	Gerardo Carillo	116,530	6.26
Liberal	Eugenio Gabuya Jr.	113,901	6.12
UNA	David Tumulak	112,047	6.02
Liberal	Roberto Cabarrubias	108,308	5.82
UNA	James Anthony Cuenco	106,034	5.70
UNA	Nendell Hanz Abella	99,100	5.33
Liberal	Richard Osmeña	97,916	5.26
Liberal	Augustus "Jun" Pe Jr.	97,462	5.24
Liberal	Gabriel Leyson	97,257	5.23
UNA	Procopio Fernandez	89,523	4.81
UNA	Tisha "Inday Tikay" Ylaya	87,729	4.71
Liberal	Zenaida Amores	85,260	4.58
UNA	Altea Lim	82,534	4.44
UNA	Lutherlee "Lotlot" Ignacio-Soon	78,669	4.23
UNA	Ronald "Raddy" Diola	70,772	3.80
Independent	Samuel Atupan	9,051	0.49
LM	Federico Peredo	6,113	0.33
Total votes		1,860,827	100.00
