= 2019 Cebu City local elections =

Election in Cebu City, Philippines on 2019

2019 Cebu City mayoral election
- May 13, 2019
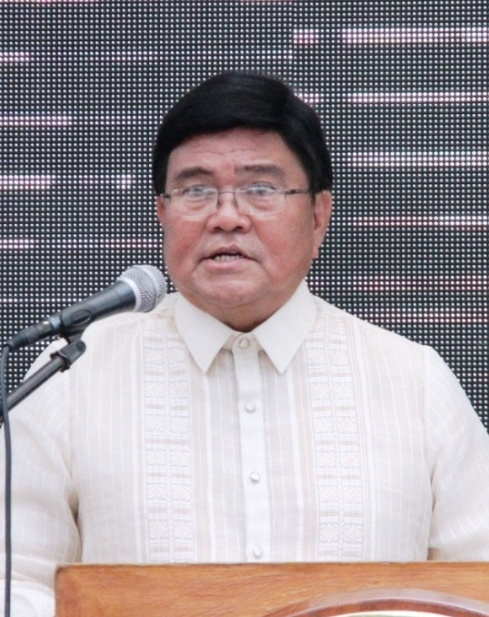

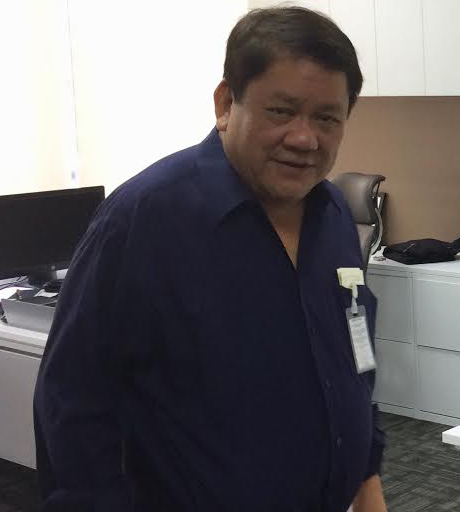
Nominee	Edgardo Labella	Tomas Osmeña
Party	PDP–Laban	LDP
Running mate	Michael Rama	Mary Ann de los Santos
Popular vote	265,738	246,813
Percentage	51.40	47.74
Mayor before election
Tomas Osmeña
BOPK
LDP
Elected Mayor
Edgardo Labella
Barug
PDP–Laban
- Vice mayoral election
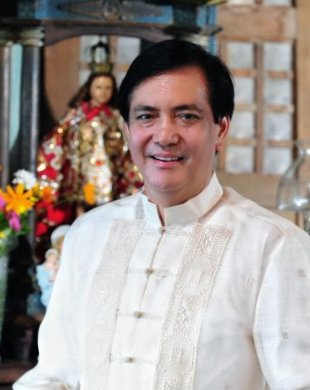

Candidate	Michael Rama	Mary Ann de los Santos
Party	UNA	LDP
Popular vote	261,685	235,007
Percentage	51.91%	46.62%
Vice Mayor before election
Edgardo Labella
Barug
PDP–Laban
Elected Vice Mayor
Michael Rama
Barug
UNA

Local elections were held in Cebu City on May 13, 2019 within the Philippine general election. Registered voters of the city elected candidates for the following elective local posts: mayor, vice mayor, district representatives, and councilors. There are two legislative districts in the city, each electing one district representative and eight councilors.

On May 14, 2019, after more than 24 hours since the polls have closed, Edgardo Labella was proclaimed as Cebu City's new mayor. He led the mayoral race with 265,738 votes, followed by Osmeña with 246,813 votes.

== Background ==
Tomas Osmeña of Bando Osmeña – Pundok Kauswagan (BOPK), who allied his group with Liberal Party, won the 2016 elections with 53.40% of the votes defeating then incumbent mayor Michael Rama of BARUG Team Rama, which was allied with United Nationalist Alliance. Meanwhile, Rama's running mate, incumbent vice mayor Edgardo Labella of BARUG Team Rama (BARUG), defeated Osmeña's running mate, then councilor Nestor Archival of BOPK, in the vice mayoralty election. Rama initially challenged the victory of Osmeña by holding a prayer rally with his supporters and threatened to file an electoral protest claiming that Osmeña committed electoral fraud.

On May 16, 2016, seven days after the 2016 elections, Rama conceded to Osmeña during the 3rd prayer rally in front of the Cebu City Hall. He reiterated however that he would pursue an electoral protest to question the results of the election.

On June 28, 2016, vice president-elect Leni Robredo administered the oath to Osmeña and six BOPK councilors who won in the 2016 elections at Cebu City Sports Center.

Despite winning as Mayor, Osmeña had to deal with a Cebu City Council that was dominated by councilors from Rama's party with eleven councilors including Cebu City Liga ng mga Barangay President Phillip Zafra who sits as an ex-officio member. During the inaugural session of the 14th Sangguniang Panlungsod, BARUG councilors prevented BOPK councilors from being able to get committee chairmanships and memberships. Instead, BOPK councilors were given with executive functions by Osmeña by designating them as deputy mayors in different fields. Osmeña defined the term "deputy mayor" as someone higher compared to holding a committee chairmanship or membership in the Cebu City Council which in turn made them as his alter egos.

The Cebu City Council experienced several shifts during the 14th Sangguniang Panlungsod which started when councilor Dave Tumulak left BARUG, where he ran and won during the 2016 elections, on August 24, 2016 to become an independent politician after a closed-door meeting with councilor Margot Osmeña, wife of mayor Osmeña. Tumulak cited the reason that he was tired of political quarrels in Cebu City and indicated his support on Osmeña's plans for Cebu City. Several days after, on August 30, 2016, councilor Nendell Hanz Abella also left BARUG to become an independent politician producing a city council with nine councilors from BARUG, six from BOPK and two from the independent bloc. On March 25, 2017, councilor Jerry Guardo, who was meted with a 3-month suspension by the DILG, left BARUG after he alleged that fellow party member Lemar Alcover, son of Councilor Pastor Alcover Jr., was behind the push for the implementation of his suspension. On the same day, Tumulak also confirmed that he was joining BOPK while Mayor Osmeña confirmed that Abella has joined them. This in turn gave the majority in the Cebu City Council to BOPK with nine councilors against BARUG's eight councilors.

BOPK's majority in the Cebu City Council was short-lived when Abella announced his resignation after he was appointed by president Rodrigo Duterte as commissioner in the 7th Division of the National Labor Relations Commission (NLRC) thus giving the two council blocs at an even 8–8 but still had vice mayor Edgardo Labella of BARUG to break the tie for party-line voting in the council. The names of Renato "Junjun" Osmeña Jr. and Inayawan barangay captain Lutherlee "Lotlot" Ignacio-Soon were recommended as replacements to Abella. Both Osmeña Jr. and Ignacio-Soon ran with BARUG but failed to make it to the Cebu City Council. Councilor Joel Garganera accused mayor Osmeña of maneuvering the appointment of their party ally as replacement of Abella in the Cebu City Council by claiming that BOPK reached out to Senator Manny Pacquiao to let former vice president Jejomar Binay, head of the United Nationalist Alliance (UNA), appoint instead Rengelle Pelayo to the council. Eventually, UNA endorsed Osmeña Jr. to fill the position vacated by Abella.

Councilor James Anthony Cuenco of BARUG was dismissed from public service on October 3, 2017 by the Office of the Ombudsman for alleged irregularities when he served as chief of staff of his father, former Cebu City South District representative Antonio Cuenco reducing BARUG's councilors to seven. Upon the appointment of Osmeña Jr. by Duterte, the council standing returned to 8-8. Erik Miguel Espina, son of former Cebu governor and senator Rene Espina, was nominated by BARUG to replace Cuenco. Espina's appointment gave BARUG the majority once again.

During the 2018 barangay and Sangguniang Kabataan elections, 49 out of the 80 elected barangay captains and 41 out of the 80 elected SK chairpersons in Cebu City were identified with BOPK. In the election for SK Federation president, BARUG fielded Sonia Cal of Barangay Tisa while BOPK fielded Jessica Resch of Barangay San Nicolas Proper. Resch won with 44 votes becoming the SK Federation president of Cebu City and ex-officio member of the Cebu City Council. Three barangay captains were initially floated as candidates for Liga ng mga Barangay (LNB) President namely Franklyn Ong of Barangay Kasambagan, Prisca Niña Mabatid of Barangay Mabolo and incumbent LNB President & councilor Phillip Zafra of Barangay Tisa. BOPK chose Ong as its candidate while Mabatid was chosen by BARUG after its candidate Zafra bowed out from the race. Despite the walkout of Mabatid's allies during the LNB elections, Ong still won with 51 votes. The election of Resch and Ong returned the majority of the Cebu City Council to BOPK with ten councilors.

In December 2018, BARUG was accredited as a political party by the Commission on Elections (COMELEC).

Councilor Espina announced on December 14, 2018 that he will only remain in his post until January 1, 2019 after the Court of Appeals reversed the ruling of the Office of the Ombudsman finding suspended councilor Cuenco guilty of serious dishonesty and grave misconduct and ordered his reinstatement to the Cebu City Council. Cuenco reported back to work as councilor on January 3, 2019.

BARUG had no mayoralty candidate for the 2019 elections as two of its leaders namely former mayor Rama and vice mayor Labella both expressed their intentions to run as mayor. On August 30, 2018, Rama announced his decision to run for vice mayor instead and gave way to Labella.

Osmeña named two of his allies, councilors Tumulak and Mary Ann de los Santos, as his possible candidate for vice mayor. There were also reports of BOPK-allied barangay captains pushing for an Osmeña-Ong tandem but Ong declined since he wanted to focus as LNB President. Osmeña officially declared de los Santos as his candidate for vice mayor during BOPK's rally at Lahug Elementary School gym. Osmeña also announced that BOPK was no longer affiliated with the Liberal Party (LP) as they have pledged allegiance to the Laban ng Demokratikong Pilipino (LDP) party of Senator Sonny Angara.

== Debate ==
The Integrated Bar of the Philippines-Cebu City Chapter organized the only mayoral and vice mayoral debate for Cebu City originally scheduled on April 22, 2019 at Cebu City Sports Club. Osmeña, his running-mate de los Santos, and Labella confirmed their attendance. Rama was the only one who declined to participate and tried to convince Labella to join him in ditching the debate saying that it would only put Osmeña on the spotlight.

The IBP-Cebu City Chapter then moved the debate schedule to May 6, 2019 to give candidates quality time to observe the Holy Week. Upon Labella's request, the debate was once again postponed since he had to attend a meeting with Duterte in Malacañang. The IBP-Cebu City Chapter granted his request to move the schedule to May 10, 2019 which the other participants also agreed.

== Mayoralty and vice mayoralty elections ==
=== Mayor ===
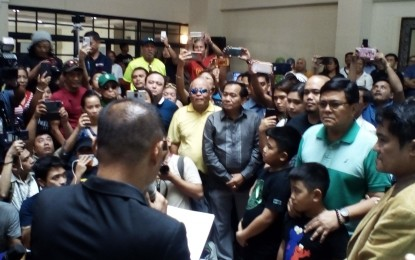
Board of Canvassers chairman Chauncey Boholst (foreground) proclaims Vice Mayor Edgardo Labella (second from right) as mayor-elect of Cebu City. Labella garnered 265,436 votes against incumbent Mayor Tomas Osmeña's 246,399 votes.

Tomas Osmeña ran for his second term as the mayor of Cebu City. Meanwhile, Edgardo Labella, who served as vice mayor of Cebu City under the administrations of Michael Rama and Osmeña, ran for his first time as mayor and defeated Osmeña.

Cebu City mayoral election
Party	Candidate	Votes	%
PDP–Laban	Edgardo Labella	265,738	51.40
LDP	Tomas Osmeña (incumbent)	246,813	47.74
Independent	Paulino Osmeña	2,735	0.53
Independent	Junry Concepcion	1,000	0.19
Independent	John Edwin Dayondon	703	0.14
Total votes		516,989	100.00
Margin of victory		18,925	3.66
PDP–Laban gain from Liberal			

==== Results by barangay ====
Legend
Barangays won by Edgardo Labella
Barangays won by Tomas Osmeña

Barangay	Geographic District	Labella BARUG/PDP–Laban		T. Osmeña BOPK/LDP		P. Osmeña Independent		Concepcion Independent		Dayondon Independent		Margin		Total votes
Barangay	Geographic District	Votes	%	Votes	%	Votes	%	Votes	%	Votes	%	Votes	%	Total votes
Adlaon	North	1,299	57.84%	928	41.32%	18	0.80%	0	0.00%	1	0.04%	371	16.52%	2,246
Agsungot	North	675	47.04%	755	52.61%	4	0.28%	1	0.07%	0	0.00%	80	5.57%	1,435
Apas	North	6,889	51.73%	6,291	47.24%	87	0.65%	31	0.23%	19	0.14%	598	4.49%	13,317
Babag	South	1,413	49.44%	1,422	49.76%	12	0.42%	6	0.21%	5	0.17%	9	0.31%	2,858
Bacayan	North	3,562	53.62%	3,019	45.45%	40	0.60%	10	0.15%	12	0.18%	543	8.17%	6,643
Banilad	North	2,825	48.01%	3,011	51.17%	34	0.58%	9	0.15%	5	0.09%	186	3.16%	5,884
Basak Pardo	South	6,017	55.58%	4,719	43.59%	51	0.47%	21	0.19%	17	0.16%	1,298	11.99%	10,825
Basak San Nicolas	South	13,186	68.40%	5,956	30.89%	82	0.43%	26	0.13%	29	0.15%	7,230	37.50%	19,279
Binaliw	North	1,105	51.30%	1,033	47.96%	11	0.51%	5	0.23%	0	0.00%	72	3.34%	2,154
Bonbon	South	1,406	42.31%	1,891	56.91%	16	0.48%	7	0.21%	3	0.09%	485	14.60%	3,323
Budlaan	North	2,494	68.31%	1,134	31.06%	14	0.38%	7	0.19%	2	0.06%	1,360	37.25%	3,651
Buhisan	South	3,220	45.11%	3,855	54.01%	43	0.60%	12	0.17%	8	0.11%	635	8.90%	7,138
Bulacao	South	6,436	49.48%	6,456	49.64%	70	0.54%	24	0.19%	20	0.15%	20	0.15%	13,006
Buot	South	810	49.60%	818	50.10%	2	0.12%	1	0.06%	2	0.12%	8	0.49%	1,633
Busay	North	3,049	50.59%	2,916	48.38%	42	0.70%	10	0.17%	10	0.17%	133	2.21%	6,027
Calamba	South	2,893	43.01%	3,765	55.98%	41	0.61%	18	0.27%	9	0.13%	872	12.96%	6,726
Cambinocot	North	1,401	72.33%	525	27.10%	7	0.36%	3	0.16%	1	0.05%	876	45.22%	1,937
Capitol Site	North	3,736	45.84%	4,334	53.17%	48	0.59%	18	0.22%	15	0.18%	598	7.34%	8,151
Carreta	North	2,997	53.91%	2,510	45.15%	30	0.54%	12	0.22%	10	0.18%	487	8.76%	5,559
Cogon Pardo	South	4,907	58.61%	3,396	40.56%	41	0.50%	17	0.20%	11	0.13%	1,511	18.05%	8,372
Cogon Ramos	North	1,194	50.70%	1,152	48.92%	3	0.13%	3	0.13%	3	0.13%	42	1.78%	2,355
Day‑as	North	1,480	50.82%	1,418	48.70%	10	0.34%	0	0.00%	4	0.14%	62	2.13%	2,912
Duljo Fatima	South	4,593	49.19%	4,672	50.04%	40	0.43%	13	0.14%	19	0.20%	79	0.85%	9,337
Ermita	North	3,103	51.33%	2,887	47.76%	37	0.61%	11	0.18%	7	0.12%	216	3.57%	6,045
Guadalupe	South	14,546	44.14%	18,086	54.88%	195	0.59%	80	0.24%	50	0.15%	3,540	10.74%	32,957
Guba	North	1,573	48.64%	1,638	50.65%	14	0.43%	4	0.12%	5	0.16%	65	2.01%	3,234
Hipodromo	North	2,916	52.03%	2,658	47.43%	19	0.34%	6	0.11%	5	0.09%	258	4.60%	5,604
Inayawan	South	7,293	48.07%	7,693	50.70%	104	0.69%	45	0.30%	37	0.24%	400	2.64%	15,172
Kalubihan	North	414	35.75%	730	63.04%	11	0.95%	1	0.09%	2	0.17%	316	27.29%	1,158
Kalunasan	South	5,120	48.06%	5,439	51.05%	54	0.51%	17	0.16%	24	0.22%	319	2.99%	10,654
Kamagayan	North	1,093	60.89%	685	38.16%	14	0.78%	1	0.06%	2	0.11%	408	22.73%	1,795
Kamputhaw	North	5,642	48.75%	5,819	50.28%	75	0.65%	24	0.21%	13	0.11%	177	1.53%	11,573
Kasambagan	North	2,703	46.67%	3,030	52.31%	36	0.62%	21	0.36%	2	0.04%	327	5.65%	5,792
Kinasang‑an Pardo	South	3,656	47.75%	3,925	51.26%	44	0.57%	14	0.18%	18	0.24%	269	3.51%	7,657
Labangon	South	9,077	49.04%	9,260	50.03%	96	0.52%	41	0.22%	35	0.19%	183	0.99%	18,509
Lahug	North	10,500	50.87%	9,914	48.03%	157	0.76%	42	0.20%	27	0.13%	586	2.84%	20,640
Lorega‑San Miguel	North	3,809	57.08%	2,819	42.24%	32	0.48%	9	0.14%	4	0.06%	990	14.84%	6,673
Lusaran	North	948	44.17%	1,180	54.99%	14	0.65%	3	0.14%	1	0.05%	232	10.81%	2,146
Luz	North	4,818	51.61%	4,450	47.66%	49	0.53%	15	0.16%	4	0.04%	368	3.94%	9,336
Mabini	North	736	51.65%	680	47.72%	6	0.42%	2	0.14%	1	0.07%	56	3.93%	1,425
Mabolo	North	7,961	55.88%	6,176	43.35%	72	0.50%	28	0.20%	10	0.07%	1,785	12.53%	14,247
Malubog	North	656	38.23%	1,044	60.84%	8	0.47%	8	0.47%	0	0.00%	388	22.61%	1,716
Mambaling	South	8,685	51.12%	8,115	47.76%	101	0.60%	51	0.30%	38	0.22%	570	3.35%	16,990
Pahina Central	North	1,619	43.66%	2,051	55.31%	28	0.76%	6	0.16%	4	0.11%	432	11.65%	3,708
Pahina San Nicolas	South	1,447	55.70%	1,135	43.69%	8	0.31%	6	0.23%	2	0.07%	312	12.00%	2,598
Pamutan	North	773	69.58%	330	29.70%	4	0.36%	3	0.27%	1	0.09%	443	39.87%	1,111
Pari-an	North	1,135	56.44%	857	42.61%	15	0.75%	2	0.10%	2	0.10%	278	13.82%	2,011
Paril	North	520	50.34%	508	49.18%	3	0.29%	1	0.10%	1	0.10%	12	1.16%	1,033
Pasil	South	3,115	50.70%	2,986	48.60%	29	0.47%	5	0.08%	9	0.15%	129	2.10%	6,144
Pit-os	North	1,938	51.39%	1,807	47.92%	20	0.53%	2	0.05%	4	0.11%	131	3.47%	3,771
Poblacion Pardo	South	6,098	52.37%	5,457	46.87%	49	0.42%	24	0.21%	15	0.13%	641	5.50%	11,643
Pulangbato	North	1,487	46.46%	1,688	52.73%	21	0.66%	2	0.06%	3	0.09%	201	6.28%	3,201
Pung-ol Sibugay	South	1,004	56.88%	751	42.55%	6	0.34%	0	0.00%	4	0.23%	253	14.33%	1,765
Punta Princesa	South	6,466	52.91%	5,666	46.37%	44	0.36%	27	0.22%	17	0.14%	800	6.55%	12,220
Quiot	South	7,436	62.20%	4,420	36.98%	44	0.37%	39	0.33%	15	0.12%	3,016	25.23%	11,954
Sambag I	North	3,961	49.82%	3,929	49.42%	37	0.47%	8	0.10%	15	0.19%	32	0.40%	7,950
Sambag II	North	4,007	52.64%	3,542	46.53%	43	0.57%	8	0.10%	12	0.16%	465	6.11%	7,612
San Antonio	North	709	51.27%	664	48.01%	7	0.51%	2	0.14%	1	0.07%	45	3.25%	1,383
San Jose	North	2,340	59.39%	1,560	39.59%	26	0.66%	10	0.26%	4	0.10%	780	19.80%	3,940
San Nicolas Proper	South	2,492	49.34%	2,506	49.61%	33	0.65%	11	0.22%	9	0.18%	14	0.28%	5,051
San Roque	North	1,511	46.98%	1,678	52.18%	18	0.56%	6	0.19%	3	0.09%	167	5.19%	3,216
Santa Cruz	North	1,051	61.25%	655	38.17%	5	0.29%	3	0.17%	2	0.12%	396	23.08%	1,716
Santo Niño	North	893	51.35%	830	47.73%	10	0.58%	4	0.23%	2	0.11%	63	3.62%	1,739
Sapangdaku	South	1,778	43.81%	2,250	55.45%	17	0.42%	7	0.17%	6	0.15%	472	11.63%	4,058
Sawang Calero	South	2,420	47.03%	2,694	52.35%	17	0.33%	10	0.19%	5	0.10%	274	5.32%	5,146
Sinsin	South	887	46.88%	995	52.59%	5	0.26%	3	0.16%	2	0.11%	108	5.71%	1,892
Sirao	North	1,009	41.57%	1,397	57.56%	17	0.70%	4	0.17%	0	0.00%	388	15.99%	2,427
Suba	South	3,579	56.95%	2,666	42.42%	22	0.35%	12	0.19%	6	0.09%	913	14.53%	6,285
Sudlon I	South	1,057	66.81%	511	32.30%	8	0.51%	4	0.25%	2	0.13%	546	34.51%	1,582
Sudlon II	South	1,261	50.56%	1,211	48.56%	13	0.52%	4	0.16%	5	0.20%	50	2.00%	2,494
T. Padilla	North	2,681	51.08%	2,531	48.22%	24	0.46%	6	0.11%	7	0.13%	150	2.86%	5,249
Tabunan	South	866	48.19%	923	51.36%	5	0.28%	2	0.11%	1	0.06%	57	3.17%	1,797
Tagba-o	South	589	56.85%	443	42.76%	3	0.29%	1	0.10%	0	0.00%	146	14.09%	1,036
Talamban	North	7,071	50.45%	6,832	48.75%	66	0.47%	24	0.17%	22	0.16%	239	1.71%	14,015
Taptap	North	653	51.34%	608	47.80%	9	0.70%	2	0.16%	0	0.00%	45	3.54%	1,272
Tejero	North	3,328	43.41%	4,275	55.77%	42	0.55%	13	0.17%	8	0.10%	947	12.35%	7,666
Tinago	North	2,055	49.01%	2,112	50.37%	20	0.48%	4	0.10%	2	0.05%	57	1.36%	4,193
Tisa	South	11,106	51.91%	10,094	47.18%	115	0.54%	53	0.25%	25	0.12%	1,012	4.73%	21,393
To-ong	South	1,376	59.26%	938	40.40%	7	0.30%	1	0.04%	0	0.00%	438	18.86%	2,322
Zapatera	North	1,184	49.89%	1,180	49.73%	11	0.46%	3	0.13%	2	0.08%	4	0.17%	2,373
Total		265,738	51.40%	246,813	47.74%	2,735	0.53%	1,000	0.19%	703	0.14	18,925	3.66%	516,989
		Labella BARUG/PDP–Laban		T. Osmeña BOPK/LDP		P. Osmeña Independent		Concepcion Independent		Dayondon Independent		Margin		Total votes

=== Vice Mayor ===
Mary Ann de los Santos, who was on her second term as Cebu City councilor for the North District and was eligible for a third and final term, opted to run for vice mayor. Michael Rama, who served 2 terms as mayor and 3 terms as vice mayor, ran again as vice mayor and defeated de los Santos.

Cebu City Vice mayoral election
Party	Candidate	Votes	%
UNA	Michael Rama	261,685	51.91
LDP	Mary Ann de los Santos	235,007	46.62
Independent	Federico Peredo	3,749	0.74
Independent	Antonio Rosaroso	3,633	0.72
Total votes		504,074	100.00
Margin of victory		26,678	5.29
UNA hold			

== District representatives ==
=== 1st District ===
Raul del Mar ran for his third and final term, and won against actor Richard Yap.

2019 Philippine House of Representatives election in the 1st District of Cebu City
Party	Candidate	Votes	%
Liberal	Raul del Mar (incumbent)	135,528	61.34
PDP–Laban	Richard Edison Yap	81,575	36.92
Independent	Florencio Villarin	2,244	1.02
Independent	Ricardo Dungog	1,609	0.73
Total votes		220,956	100.00
Margin of victory		53,953	24.42
Liberal hold			

=== 2nd District ===
Rodrigo Abellanosa ran for his third and final term, and won against former Cebu City councilor for the South District Jocelyn Pesquera.

2019 Philippine House of Representatives election in the 2nd District of Cebu City
Party	Candidate	Votes	%
LDP	Rodrigo Abellanosa (incumbent)	163,752	61.22
PDP–Laban	Jocelyn Pesquera	103,717	38.78
Total votes		267,469	100.00
Margin of victory		60,035	22.44
LDP gain from Liberal			

== City Council ==
Incumbents are expressed in italics. Number indicates the ballot number assigned for the candidates by COMELEC.

=== By ticket ===
==== Laban ng Demokratikong Pilipino/Bando Osmeña – Pundok Kauswagan ====
Cebu City North District (1st District)
#	Name	Party
2.	Sisinio Andales	LDP
3.	Nestor Archival	LDP
4.	Alvin Arcilla	LDP
6.	Alvin Dizon	LDP
9.	Jerry Guardo	LDP
11.	Lea Ouano-Japson	LDP
13.	Marlo Maamo	LDP
17.	Joy Augustus Young	LDP

Cebu City South District (2nd District)
#	Name	Party
2.	Marie Velle Abella	LDP
4.	Raul Alcoseba	LDP
5.	Roberto Cabarrubias	LDP
11.	Eugenio Gabuya Jr.	LDP
12.	Michael Gacasan	LDP
17.	Rengelle Pelayo	LDP
19.	Kirk Bryan Repollo	LDP
20.	David Tumulak	Nacionalista

==== Partido Demokratiko Pilipino-Lakas ng Bayan/Partido Barug ====
Cebu City North District (1st District)
#	Name	Party
1.	Pastor Alcover Jr.	UNA
5.	Ramil Ayuman	PDP–Laban
7.	Raymond Alvin Garcia	PDP–Laban
8.	Joel Garganera	PDP–Laban
10.	Ernesto Herrera II	PDP–Laban
12.	Reynald Lauron	PDP–Laban
14.	Prisca Niña Mabatid	PDP–Laban
16.	Noel Eleuterio Wenceslao	PDP–Laban

Cebu City South District (2nd District)
#	Name	Party
7.	Gerard Joe Carillo	PDP–Laban
8.	Antonio Cuenco	PDP–Laban
9.	Pancrasio Esparis	PDP–Laban
10.	Erik Miguel Espina	PDP–Laban
13.	Donaldo Hontiveros	PDP–Laban
16.	Renato Osmeña Jr.	PDP–Laban
18.	Eduardo Rama Jr.	PDP–Laban
21.	Phillip Zafra	PDP–Laban

==== Partido Federal ng Pilipinas ====
Cebu City South District (2nd District)
#	Name	Party
1.	Reynaldo Abad	PFP

==== Independents ====
Independent Cebu City North District (1st District)
#	Name	Party
15.	Eliseo Tumulak	Independent

Independent Cebu City South District (2nd District)
#	Name	Party
3.	Sherwin Luie Abella	Independent
6.	Alejandro Cabido	Independent
14.	Napoleon Navarro	Independent
15.	Ian Anthony Osmeña	Independent

=== By district ===
==== 1st District ====
Note: Incumbent councilors Alvin Arcilla and Sisinio Andales were disqualified by COMELEC after it issued a writ of execution for the certificate of finality of the earlier decision canceling Arcilla's and Andales' certificate of candidacy (COC).

- Key: Italicized: incumbent

City Council election at Cebu City's 1st district
Party	Candidate	Votes	%
LDP	Nestor Archival	124,466	8.55
PDP–Laban	Prisca Niña Mabatid	113,908	7.83
LDP	Joy Augustus Young	112,707	7.75
LDP	Lea Ouano-Japson	106,218	7.30
LDP	Sisinio Andales	106,185	7.30
LDP	Alvin Arcilla	104,476	7.18
LDP	Alvin Dizon	102,911	7.07
PDP–Laban	Raymond Alvin Garcia	101,578	6.98
LDP	Jerry Guardo	99,115	6.81
PDP–Laban	Joel Garganera	96,561	6.64
PDP–Laban	Noel Eleuterio Wenceslao	93,522	6.43
LDP	Marlo Maamo	86,189	5.92
UNA	Pastor Alcover Jr.	84,359	5.80
PDP–Laban	Ramil Ayuman	83,377	5.73
PDP–Laban	Ernesto Herrera II	75,094	5.16
PDP–Laban	Reynald Lauron	68,099	4.68
Independent	Eliseo Tumulak	20,851	1.43
Total votes		1,455,150	100.00

==== 2nd District ====
- Key: Italicized: incumbent

City Council election at Cebu City's 2nd district
Party	Candidate	Votes	%
PDP–Laban	Donaldo Hontiveros	161,347	8.34
Nacionalista	David Tumulak	156,755	8.10
PDP–Laban	Eduardo Rama Jr.	141,716	7.32
PDP–Laban	Antonio Cuenco	140,139	7.24
LDP	Eugenio Gabuya Jr.	123,477	6.38
PDP–Laban	Renato Osmeña Jr.	121,884	6.30
LDP	Raul Alcoseba	117,991	6.10
PDP–Laban	Phillip Zafra	115,292	5.96
LDP	Roberto Cabarrubias	111,090	5.74
LDP	Marie Velle Abella	110,131	5.69
PDP–Laban	Gerard Joe Carillo	108,247	5.59
PDP–Laban	Pancrasio Esparis	103,406	5.34
LDP	Michael Gacasan	94,258	4.87
PDP–Laban	Erik Miguel Espina	82,327	4.25
LDP	Rengelle Pelayo	78,394	4.05
LDP	Kirk Bryan Repollo	71,896	3.71
Independent	Ian Anthony Osmeña	42,182	2.18
Independent	Sherwin Luie Abella	20,262	1.05
Independent	Napoleon Navarro	13,769	0.71
PFP	Reynaldo Abad	12,012	0.62
Independent	Alejandro Cabido	8,782	0.45
Total votes		1,935,357	100.00

== Electoral dispute ==
In a five-page decision promulgated on June 28, 2019, the COMELEC First Division declared Sherwin Luie Abella a nuisance candidate after he failed to answer the petition for his disqualification filed by BOPK candidate for councilor Atty. Marie Velle "Amay" Abella, who received 110,131 votes in the 2019 elections. Both candidates share the same surname and ran for an elective post for councilor in Cebu City's 2nd (South) district. Amay was furnished a copy of the said order on July 2, 2019.

Amay hoped to get the 20,262 votes cast for Sherwin giving her 130,393 votes, which would dislodge newly-elected councilor Phillip Zafra who clinched the 8th slot in the Cebu City Council for south district. She only needs 5,162 votes to unseat Zafra. Should she succeed in unseating Zafra, this will raise the number of BOPK-allied councilors from six to seven.

On August 30, 2019, the COMELEC First Division ruled with finality that Sherwin has been disqualified for being a nuisance candidate. However, the election body ruled that not all of the votes garnered by Sherwin will go to the Amay. Upon the checking of ballots, if a voter voted for both candidates, this vote will not be credited to Amay. Only votes cast for Sherwin will automatically be credited to Amay according to the decision.

On May 26, 2020, Amay died due to illness, according to Cebu City south district representative Rodrigo Abellanosa.

COMELEC went on with the recount of votes for Amay in September 2021 but was halted due to an appeal from Councilors Zafra and Renato Osmeña Jr.
