= 2016 Cebu City local elections =

Election in Cebu City, Philippines on 2016

2016 Cebu City mayoral election
- May 9, 2016
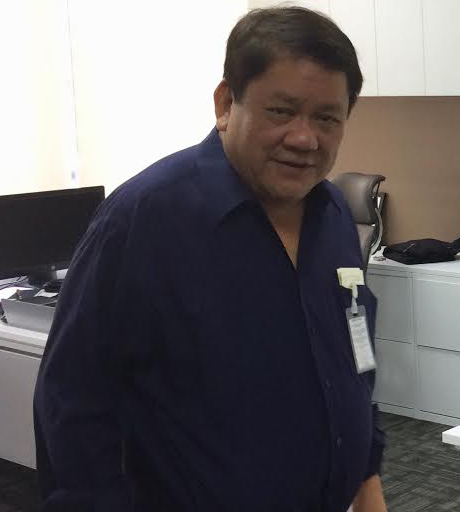

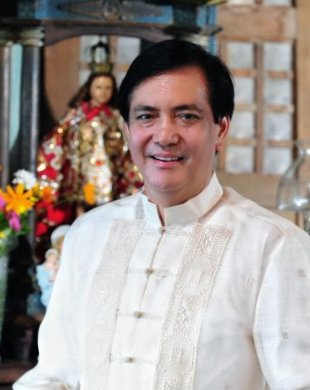
Nominee	Tomas Osmeña	Michael Rama
Party	Liberal	UNA
Running mate	Nestor Archival	Edgardo Labella
Popular vote	266,819	232,925
Percentage	53.40	46.60
Mayor before election
Michael Rama
BARUG Team Rama
UNA
Elected Mayor
Tommy Osmeña
BOPK
Liberal
- Vice mayoral election
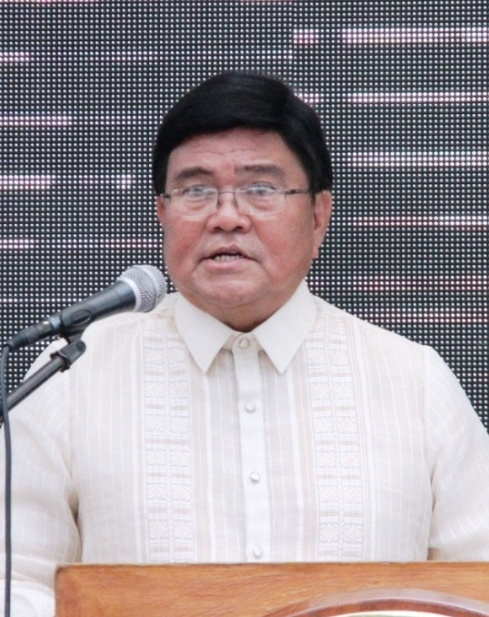

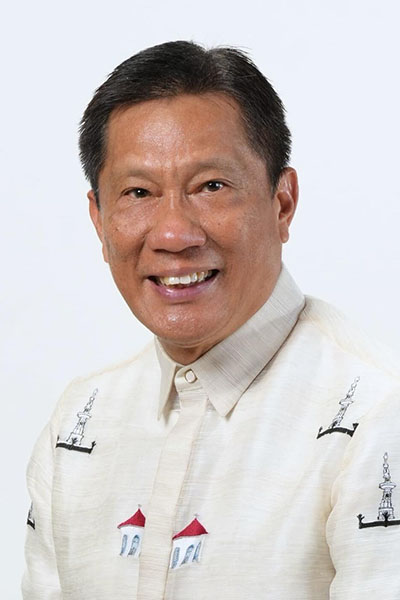
Candidate	Edgardo Labella	Nestor Archival
Party	UNA	Liberal
Popular vote	252,201	222,337
Percentage	53.15%	46.85%
Vice Mayor before election
Edgardo Labella
BARUG Team Rama
UNA
Elected Vice Mayor
Edgardo Labella
BARUG Team Rama
UNA

Local elections were held in Cebu City on May 9, 2016, within the Philippine general election. Registered voters of the city elected candidates for the following elective local posts: mayor, vice mayor, district representatives, and eight councilors for each district—there are two legislative districts in the city.

Tomas Osmeña, who previously served as Mayor of Cebu City, defeated incumbent Michael Rama who was seeking for his third and last term by a margin of 33,894 votes.

== Mayoralty and vice mayoralty elections ==
=== Mayor ===
Michael Rama ran for his third and last term as the Mayor of Cebu City but was defeated by former Mayor Tomas Osmeña, who ran against Rama for the second time since losing to him in the 2013 elections.

Cebu City mayoral election
Party	Candidate	Votes	%
Liberal	Tomas Osmeña	266,819	53.40
UNA	Michael Rama (incumbent)	232,925	46.60
Total votes		499,744	100.00
Margin of victory		33,894	6.80
Liberal gain from UNA			

=== Vice Mayor ===
Edgardo Labella ran for his second term as the Vice Mayor of Cebu City and defeated incumbent Cebu City Councilor for the North District Nestor Archival.

Cebu City Vice mayoral election
Party	Candidate	Votes	%
UNA	Edgardo Labella (incumbent)	252,201	53.15
Liberal	Nestor Archival	222,337	46.85
Total votes		474,538	100.00
Margin of victory		29,864	6.30
UNA hold			

== District representatives ==
=== 1st District ===
Raul del Mar ran for his second term, and won.

2016 Philippine House of Representatives election in the 1st District of Cebu City
Party	Candidate	Votes	%
Liberal	Raul del Mar (incumbent)	134,940	66.26
UNA	Alvin Garcia	64,348	31.60
Independent	Ricardo Adlawan	2,400	1.18
Independent	Juan Arenasa	1,952	0.96
Total votes		203,640	100.00
Margin of victory		70,592	34.66
Liberal hold			

=== 2nd District ===
Rodrigo Abellanosa ran for his second term, and won.

2016 Philippine House of Representatives election in the 2nd District of Cebu City
Party	Candidate	Votes	%
Liberal	Rodrigo Abellanosa (incumbent)	148,838	59.26
UNA	Gerardo Carillo	97,293	38.74
Independent	Lea Ong	5,013	2.00
Total votes		251,144	100.00
Margin of victory		51,545	20.52
Liberal hold			

== City Council ==
Incumbents are expressed in italics. Number indicates the ballot number assigned for the candidates by the Commission on Elections (COMELEC).

=== By ticket ===
==== Liberal Party/Bando Osmeña-Pundok Kauswagan ====
Cebu City North District (1st District)
#	Name	Party
2.	Sisinio Andales	Liberal
3.	Alvin Arcilla	Liberal
10.	Ma. Nida Cabrera	Liberal
11.	Mary Ann De Los Santos	Liberal
12.	Alvin Dizon	Liberal
19.	Garry Lao	Liberal
24.	Malou Tabar	Liberal
28.	Joy Augustus Young	Liberal

Cebu City South District (2nd District)
#	Name	Party
3.	Bonel Balingit	Liberal
4.	Victor Buendia	Liberal
9.	Eugenio Gabuya Jr.	Liberal
12.	Allan Nacorda	Liberal
14.	Randy Navarro	Liberal
15.	Margarita Osmeña	Liberal
17.	Danilo Pacaña	Liberal
22.	Anne Vestil-Palomo	Liberal

==== United Nationalist Alliance/Barug Team Rama ====
Cebu City North District (1st District)
#	Name	Party
1.	Pastor Alcover Jr.	UNA
4.	Ramil Ayuman	UNA
14.	Raymond Alvin Garcia	UNA
15.	Joel Garganera	UNA
16.	Jerry Guardo	UNA
17.	Edwin Jagmoc Sr.	UNA
18.	Edgardo Labella II	UNA
27.	Noel Eleuterio Wenceslao	UNA

Cebu City South District (2nd District)
#	Name	Party
1.	Nendell Hanz Abella	UNA
7.	James Anthony Cuenco	UNA
8.	Jose Daluz III	UNA
11.	Lutherlee Ignacio-Soon	UNA
16.	Renato Osmeña Jr.	UNA
19.	Jocelyn Pesquera	UNA
20.	Eduardo Rama Jr.	UNA
21.	David Tumulak	UNA

==== Nacionalista Party ====
Cebu City North District (1st District)
#	Name	Party
23.	Max Surban	Nacionalista

==== Kilusang Bagong Lipunan ====
Cebu City North District (1st District)
#	Name	Party
13.	Edgardo Eman	KBL

==== Philippine Green Republican Party ====
Cebu City North District (1st District)
#	Name	Party
8.	Letty Bucayan	PGRP
22.	Francisco Sevilleno	PGRP
25.	Carmelito Tolop Sr.	PGRP

Cebu City South District (2nd District)
#	Name	Party
2.	Nieza Alferez-Zafico	PGRP
5.	Janet Calleno	PGRP
10.	Liza Gorre	PGRP
24.	Terry Ybañez	PGRP

==== Independents ====
Independent Cebu City North District (1st District)
#	Name	Party
5.	Cynthia Barrit	Independent
6.	Lorenzo Basamot	Independent
7.	Edward Bersabal	Independent
9.	Ugen Cabalse	Independent
20.	Wendel Mascardo	Independent
21.	Arman Perez	Independent
26.	Eliseo Tumulak	Independent

Independent Cebu City South District (2nd District)
#	Name	Party
6.	Romy Capangpangan	Independent
13.	Patricio Navarro	Independent
18.	Federico Peredo	Independent
23.	Abay Abay Villaver	Independent

=== By district ===
==== 1st District ====
- Key: Italicized: incumbent

Of six councilors running for re-election, only three succeeded: Arcilla, De Los Santos, and Andales. They were joined by former councilor Young, and by neophytes Guardo, Garcia, Alcover, and Garganera. Incumbents Dizon, Wenceslao, and Cabrera lost their seats.

City Council election at Cebu City's 1st district
Party	Candidate	Votes	%
Liberal	Alvin Arcilla	103,219	6.76
Liberal	Mary Ann De Los Santos	101,590	6.66
Liberal	Sisinio Andales	100,803	6.60
Liberal	Joy Augustus Young	96,993	6.35
UNA	Jerry Guardo	96,414	6.32
UNA	Raymond Alvin Garcia	95,392	6.25
UNA	Pastor Alcover Jr.	92,940	6.09
UNA	Joel Garganera	92,660	6.07
Liberal	Alvin Dizon	91,102	5.97
UNA	Edgardo "Jaypee" Labella II	88,936	5.83
UNA	Noel Eleuterio Wenceslao	86,640	5.68
UNA	Ramil Ayuman	81,975	5.37
Liberal	Ma. Nida Cabrera	81,256	5.32
UNA	Edwin Jagmoc Sr.	77,124	5.05
Liberal	Garry Lao	71,288	4.67
Liberal	Malou Tabar	69,213	4.53
Nacionalista	Max Surban	16,536	1.08
Independent	Eliseo Tumulak	15,924	1.04
Independent	Lorenzo Basamot	13,649	0.89
Independent	Cynthia Barrit	9,082	0.60
Independent	Arman Perez	6,651	0.44
Independent	Edward Bersabal	6,630	0.43
Independent	Ugen Cabalse	6,408	0.42
KBL	Edgardo Eman	5,713	0.37
PGRP	Francisco Sevilleno	5,606	0.37
PGRP	Letty Bucayan	5,348	0.35
Independent	Wendel Mascardo	5,348	0.35
PGRP	Carmelito Tolop, Sr.	1,907	0.12
Total votes		1,526,347	100.00

==== 2nd District ====
- Key: Italicized: incumbent

All five councilors running for re-election successfully defended their seats. They were joined by former councilors Rama Jr., Daluz III, and Pesquera, with no first-time members winning.

City Council election at Cebu City's 2nd district
Party	Candidate	Votes	%
UNA	David Tumulak	144,727	7.78
Liberal	Margarita Osmeña	143,066	7.69
UNA	Eduardo Rama Jr.	139,498	7.50
UNA	Jose Daluz III	133,155	7.16
UNA	Nendell Hanz Abella	132,636	7.13
Liberal	Eugenio Gabuya Jr.	129,293	6.95
UNA	James Anthony Cuenco	119,384	6.42
UNA	Jocelyn Pesquera	116,926	6.28
UNA	Renato Osmeña Jr.	102,723	5.52
UNA	Lutherlee “Lotlot” Ignacio-Soon	101,714	5.47
Liberal	Victor Buendia	101,593	5.46
Liberal	Bonel Balingit	99,015	5.32
Liberal	Allan "Goliat" Nacorda	96,597	5.19
Liberal	Danilo Pacaña	87,809	4.72
Liberal	Randy Navarro	75,083	4.03
Liberal	Anne Vestil-Palomo	60,061	3.23
Independent	Patricio Navarro	18,617	1.00
PGRP	Janet Calleno	10,267	0.55
PGRP	Terry Ybañez	10,002	0.54
Independent	Abay Abay Villaver	9,308	0.50
Independent	Romy Capangpangan	8,575	0.46
PGRP	Liza Gorre	7,542	0.41
Independent	Federico Peredo	6,899	0.37
PGRP	Nieza Alferez-Zafico	6,337	0.34
Total votes		1,860,827	100.00
