= Partido Barug =

Political party in the Philippines

- Abbreviation: BARUG
- Leader: Michael Rama
- Founded: 2012
- Split from: BOPK
- National affiliation: UNA (2012–2018); PDP–Laban (2018–present)
- Colours: Green and yellow
- House of Representatives (Cebu City seats): 1 / 2
- City Mayor: 0 / 1
- City Vice Mayor: 0 / 1
- Cebu City Council: 4 / 16

Partido Barug (lit. transl. Stand Party), commonly known as BARUG, is a regional political party based in Cebu City, Philippines. Former Cebu City Mayor Michael Rama is its founding president.

BARUG is currently affiliated with PDP–Laban since 2018. It has formed an alliance with Kugi Uswag Sugbo and Partido Panaghiusa for the 2022 elections.

== History ==
Originally called as "Team Rama" and later "BARUG Team Rama", the party was formed in 2012 to support the candidacy of then mayor Michael Rama, who bolted from Bando Osmeña – Pundok Kauswagan on June 2, 2011.

The group was accredited as a political party by the Commission on Elections on 2018 and changed its name from "Barug Team Rama" to "Partido Barug".

== Electoral history ==
=== 2013 local elections ===
In the 2013 elections, BARUG was allied with United Nationalist Alliance.

They won four seats in the Cebu City Council along with its candidates for mayor, Michael Rama and for vice mayor, Edgardo Labella.

=== 2016 local elections ===
In the 2016 elections, BARUG kept its alliance with United Nationalist Alliance endorsing then vice president Jejomar Binay and then senator Gregorio Honasan for president and vice president, respectively.

They won ten seats in the Cebu City Council along with its candidate for vice mayor, Edgardo Labella.

=== 2019 local elections ===
In the 2019 elections, BARUG withdrew its alliance with United Nationalist Alliance and allied itself with PDP–Laban after several of its members joined the latter.

They won eight seats in the Cebu City Council along with its candidates for mayor, Edgardo Labella and for vice mayor, Michael Rama.

=== 2022 local elections ===
After the death of Mayor Labella on November 19, 2021, Rama ascended to the mayorship while Councilor Dondon Hontiveros became the new vice mayor. Barug nominated former councilor Jocelyn "Joy" Pesquera to fill Hontiveros' vacated seat. She was formally appointed by President Rodrigo Duterte on February 11, 2022.

In the 2022 elections, BARUG continued to align itself with PDP–Laban. The party initially endorsed incumbent senator Bong Go and incumbent Davao City mayor Sara Duterte for president and vice president, respectively. On November 30, 2021, Go withdrew his bid for the presidency prompting BARUG to choose a new presidential bet. On January 26, 2022, they declared their support for the presidential campaign of former senator Bongbong Marcos.

== Electoral performance ==
=== Mayor ===
Election	Candidate	Number of votes	Share of votes	Outcome of election
2013	Michael Rama	215,425	50.70%	Won
2016	Michael Rama	232,925	46.60%	Lost
2019	Edgardo Labella	265,738	51.40%	Won
2022	Michael Rama	239,656	40.85%	Won
2025	Michael Rama	120,124	20.57%	Lost

=== Vice mayor ===
Election	Candidate	Number of votes	Share of votes	Outcome of election
2013	Edgardo Labella	200,605	50.05%	Won
2016	Edgardo Labella	252,201	53.15%	Won
2019	Michael Rama	261,685	51.91%	Won
2022	Raymond Alvin Garcia	283,235	52.21%	Won
2025	Donaldo Hontiveros	190,586	33.33%	Lost

=== House of Representatives ===
==== Cebu City ====
Election	Seats allocated	Outcome of election
2013	0 / 2	Lost
2016	0 / 2	Lost
2019	0 / 2	Lost
2022	1 / 2	Tied with BO-PK
2025	1 / 2	Tied with KUSUG

=== City council ===
Election	Seats	Outcome of election
2013	4 / 16	Lost
2016	10 / 16	Won
2019	8 / 16	Tied with BOPK (Note: Barug and BO–PK have 8 councilors each, making a 50–50 split. Vice Mayor Mike Rama, and later Vice Mayor Dondon Hontiveros, in their role as presiding officer of the city council, serve as the tie-breaking vote, thus giving Barug an effective majority)
2022	12 / 16	Won
2025	4 / 16	Majority Coalition with KUSUG

== See also ==
- Bando Osmeña – Pundok Kauswagan
- Kugi Uswag Sugbo
- Partido Panaghiusa
