= Margot Osmeña =

Filipino politician

The Honorable Margot Osmeña
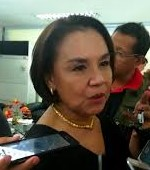

Mayor of Cebu City Acting
- In office May 17, 2016 – June 30, 2016
- Vice Mayor: Lea Ouano Japson
- Preceded by: Michael Rama
- Succeeded by: Tomas Osmeña

Member of the Cebu City Council from the 2nd district
- In office June 30, 2010 – May 17, 2016
- In office June 30, 2016 – June 30, 2019

Personal details
- Born: Margarita Lim Vargas; July 25, 1949 (age 77) Tokyo, Japan
- Party: Bando Osmeña – Pundok Kauswagan (BOPK; local party); LDP (national party; 2021–present)
- Other political affiliations: Liberal (2010–2019)
- Spouse: Tomas Osmeña (m. 1983)
- Children: Ramon Miguel Osmeña
- Occupation: Politician
- Profession: Banker

Margarita "Margot" Lim Vargas-Osmeña (born July 25, 1949) is a Filipino politician who served as a member of the Cebu City Council from 2010 to 2019. She is married to former mayor of Cebu City Tomas Osmeña. She was the Granddaughter of the First Executive Secretary of the Philippines, Jorge L. Vargas, who served under President Manuel L. Quezon.

A member of the Vargas clan of Panay and Negros islands, Osmeña was born in Japan and lived there for one and a half years. She grew up in Manila, where she finished her studies, then moved to the United States where she stayed for eight years. She worked as a banker in both the Philippines and the United States. In 1983, she married Tomas Osmeña, son of former senator Sergio Osmeña Jr. and grandson of former president Sergio Osmeña, and eventually settled in Cebu in 1983.

She first ran as a city councilor in the 2010 elections when her husband was term-limited as mayor, and went on to serve for three consecutive terms until 2019. Osmeña also briefly served as acting mayor from May 17, 2016 to June 30, 2016 with the suspension of then mayor Michael Rama.

Osmeña ran for the position of mayor of Cebu City in the 2022 elections but lost to then sitting Mayor Michael Rama.

Political offices
Preceded by Michael Rama	Mayor of Cebu City; Acting; 2016	Succeeded by Tomas Osmeña
