= 2001 Cebu City local elections =

Election in Cebu City, Philippines on 2001

2001 Cebu City mayoral election
- May 14, 2001
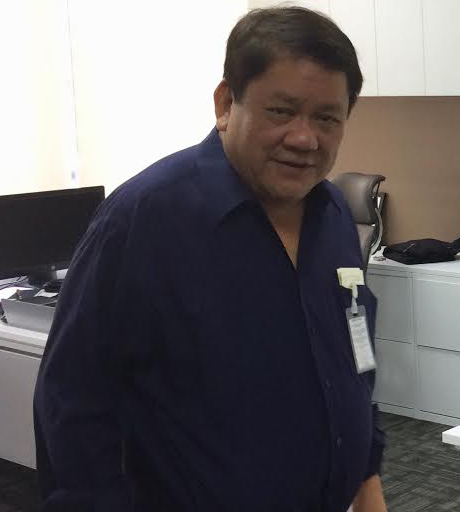

Nominee	Tomas Osmeña	Alvin Garcia
Party	PROMDI	Kusug
Running mate	Michael Rama	Koko Holganza
Popular vote	128,754	125,694
Mayor before election
Alvin Garcia
KAMPI
Elected Mayor
Tomas Osmeña
PROMDI

Local elections were held in Cebu City on May 14, 2001, within the Philippine general election. Registered voters of the city elected candidates for the following elective local posts: mayor, vice mayor, district representatives, and eight councilors for each district. There are two legislative districts in the city.

== Background ==
=== Mayoral ===
Tomas Osmeña was formerly the Mayor of Cebu City for 2 terms (1988 to 1995). He then endorsed the former Vice Mayor Alvin Garcia (also running for mayor) to run for mayor, then winning.

=== Vice Mayoral ===
Mike Rama was the former member of the Cebu City Council from the 2nd District before running for Vice Mayor.

== Mayoralty and vice mayoralty elections ==
=== Mayor ===
Cebu City mayoral election
Party	Candidate	Votes	%
PROMDI	Tomas Osmeña	128,754	
Kusug	Alvin Garcia	125,694	
Independent	Rodolfo Laconza	NA	
PMP	Stephen Clint Osmeña	NA	
PMP	Miguel Selim	NA	
Total votes		NA	100.00

=== Vice mayor ===
Cebu City Vice mayoral election
Party	Candidate	Votes	%
PROMDI	Michael Rama	130,988	
Kusug	Koko Holganza	NA	
Independent	Rico Pada	NA	
Total votes		NA	100.00

== District representatives ==
=== 1st District ===
2001 Philippine House of Representatives election in Cebu City's 1st congressional district
Party	Candidate	Votes	%
PROMDI	Raul del Mar	94,589	
Independent	Florencio Villarin	10,172	
Independent	Vicente Gonzalve Jr.	412	
PDP–Laban	Jose Mari Lozada	108	
Total votes		NA	100.00
PROMDI hold			

=== 2nd District ===
2001 Philippine House of Representatives election in the 2nd District of Cebu City
Party	Candidate	Votes	%
PROMDI	Antonio Cuenco	57,250	
Kusug	Aristotle Batuhan	53,953	
PMP	Jacinto Iran Sr.	493	
Independent	Abadiano Edgar	212	
Independent	Romulo Sogue	59	
Total votes		NA	100.00
PROMDI hold			
