= 2004 Cebu City local elections =

Election in Cebu City, Philippines on 2004

2004 Cebu City mayoral election
- May 10, 2004
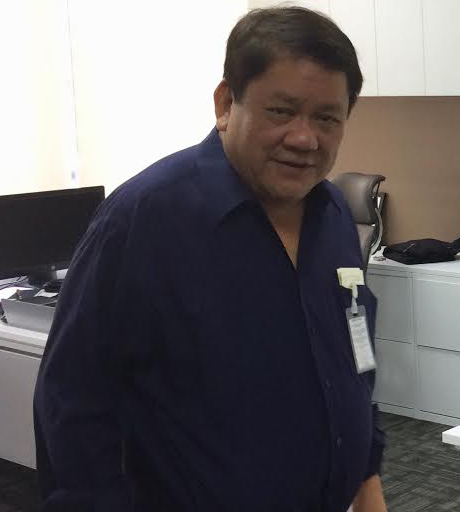

Nominee	Tomas Osmeña	Alvin Garcia
Party	Lakas	Kusug
Running mate	Michael Rama	Ramiro Madarang
Popular vote	180,215	140,629
Mayor before election
Tomas Osmeña
Lakas–CMD
Elected Mayor
Tomas Osmeña
Lakas–CMD

Local elections were held in Cebu City on May 10, 2004, within the Philippine general election. Registered voters of the city elected candidates for the following elective local posts: mayor, vice mayor, district representatives, and eight councilors for each district. There are two legislative districts in the city.

== Mayoralty and vice mayoralty elections ==
=== Mayor ===
Incumbent Mayor Tomas Osmeña defeated his main opponent, former Mayor Alvin Garcia.

Cebu City mayoral election
Party	Candidate	Votes	%
Lakas	Tomas Osmeña (incumbent)	180,215	
Kusug	Alvin Garcia	140,629	
Independent	Ananias Burlas	123	
Total votes			100.00
Lakas hold			

=== Vice mayor ===
Cebu City vice mayoral election
Party	Candidate	Votes	%
Lakas	Michael Rama (incumbent)	249,256	
Kusug	Ramiro Madarang	7,675	
Independent	Rogelio Amante	167	
Independent	Eleuterio Ubanan	51	
Total votes			100.00
Lakas hold			

== District representatives ==
=== 1st District ===
2004 Philippine House of Representatives election in the 1st District of Cebu City
Party	Candidate	Votes	%
Lakas	Raul del Mar (incumbent)	124,956	
Kusug	Danilo Fernan	11,470	
Independent	Florencio Villarin	2,486	
Independent	Russeo Fernan	357	
Independent	Juan Arenasa	247	
Total votes		139,516	100.00
Lakas hold			

=== 2nd District ===
2004 Philippine House of Representatives election in the 2nd District of Cebu City
Party	Candidate	Votes	%
Lakas	Antonio Cuenco (incumbent)	88,556	
Kusug	Aristotle Batuhan	75,311	
Total votes		163,867	100.00
Lakas hold			

== City Council elections ==
=== By district ===
==== 1st District ====
City Council election at Cebu City's 1st district
Party	Candidate	Votes	%
Lakas	Hilario Davide III	98,594	N/A
Lakas	Nestor Archival	87,203	N/A
Lakas	Sylvan Jakosalem	86,035	N/A
Independent	Edgardo Labella	81,836	N/A
Lakas	Gabriel Leyson	81,711	N/A
Lakas	Christoper Alix	77,411	N/A
Lakas	Edwin Jagmoc	70,605	N/A
Lakas	Augustus Pe Jr.	65,644	N/A

==== 2nd District ====
City Council election at Cebu City's 2nd district
Party	Candidate	Votes	%
Lakas	Rodrigo Abellanosa	106,053	N/A
Lakas	Eduardo Rama Jr.	103,997	N/A
Lakas	Gerardo Carillo	101,737	N/A
Lakas	Arsenio Pacaña	97,436	N/A
Lakas	Jocelyn Pesquera	95,737	N/A
Lakas	Procopio Fernandez	87,340	N/A
Lakas	Raul Alcoseba	82,509	N/A
Lakas	Jose Daluz III	81,271	N/A
