= Mike Rama =

Former mayor of Cebu City (born 1954)

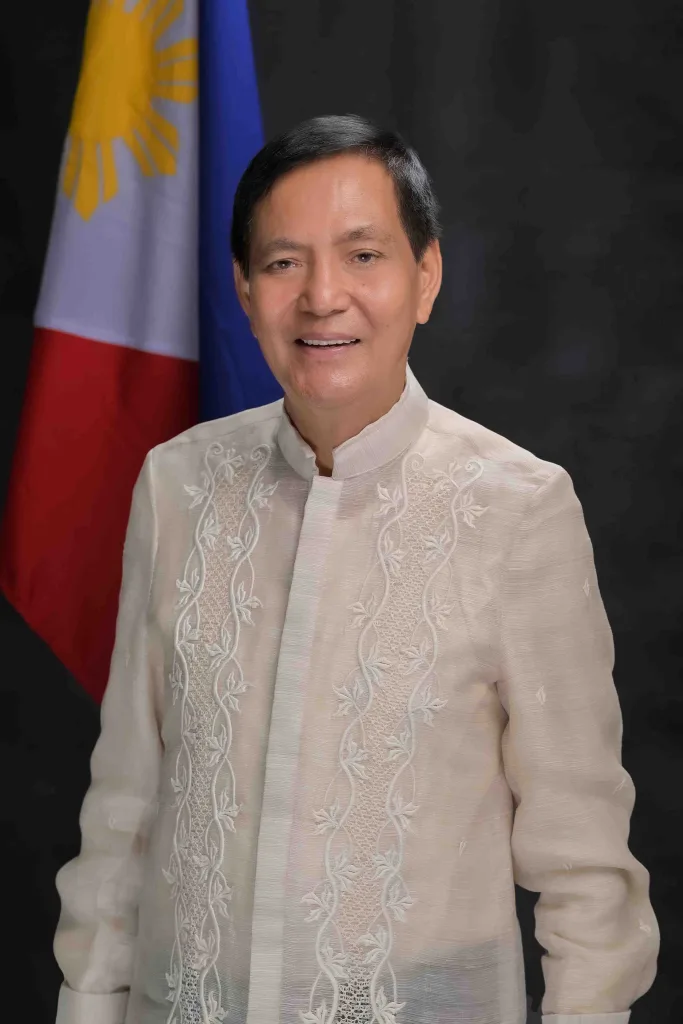
- Official Portrait, 2022

26th Mayor of Cebu City
- In office November 20, 2021 – October 3, 2024; Suspended: May 8 – October 3, 2024
- Vice Mayor: Dondon Hontiveros (2021–2022); Raymond Alvin Garcia (2022–2024)
- Preceded by: Edgardo Labella
- Succeeded by: Raymond Alvin Garcia
- In office June 30, 2010 – May 17, 2016; Suspended: December 11, 2015 – February 8, 2016
- Vice Mayor: Joy Young (2010–2013); Edgardo Labella (2013–2016)
- Preceded by: Tomas Osmeña
- Succeeded by: Margarita Osmeña (acting); Tomas Osmeña

16th Vice Mayor of Cebu City
- In office June 30, 2019 – November 19, 2021
- Mayor: Edgardo Labella
- Preceded by: Edgardo Labella
- Succeeded by: Dondon Hontiveros
- In office June 30, 2001 – June 30, 2010
- Mayor: Tomas Osmeña
- Preceded by: Renato V. Osmeña Sr.
- Succeeded by: Joy Young

Member of the Cebu City Council from the 2nd (South) district
- In office June 30, 1992 – June 30, 2001

Personal details
- Born: Michael Lopez Rama; October 28, 1954 (age 71) Cebu City, Philippines
- Party: Barug (local; 2012-present); PDP (national; 2019–present)
- Other political affiliations: BO-PK (1992–2011); PROMDI (until 2004); Lakas (2004–2009); Liberal (2009–2012); UNA (2012–2019)
- Spouses: Araceli Lim Francisco (ann. 2000); Malou Mandanat Rama (m. 2022)
- Children: 3
- Parents: Fernando Genson Rama (father); Natividad Lopez (mother)
- Relatives: Rama family
- Education: Velez College (BS); San Beda College (LL.B)
- Occupation: Politician
- Profession: HRD manager, Lawyer
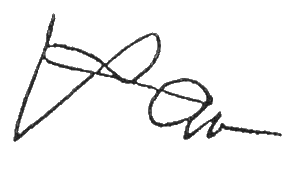
- Signature

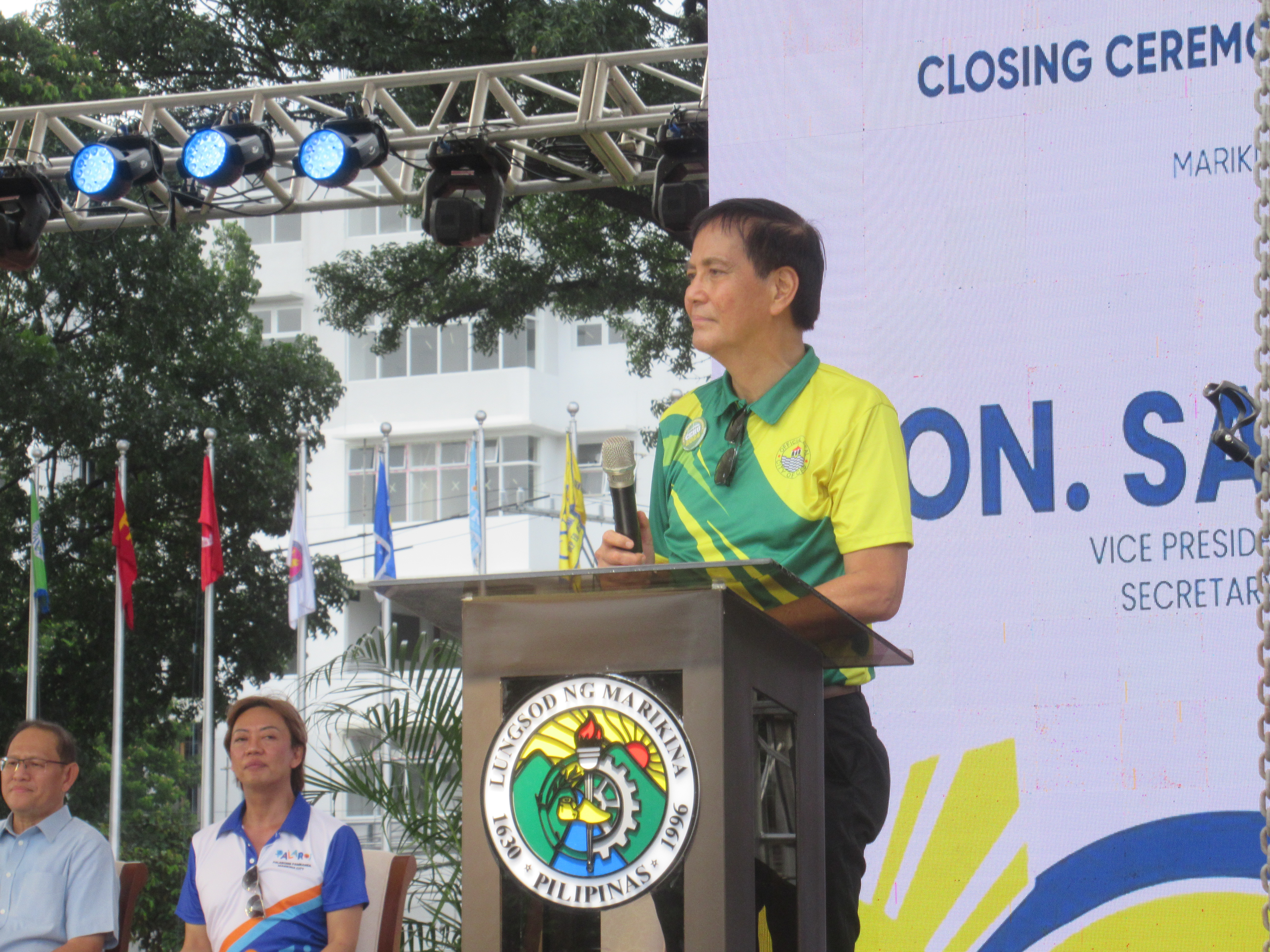
Rama at Marikina Sports Center

Michael Lopez Rama (born October 28, 1954) is a Filipino politician and lawyer who served as the 26th Mayor of Cebu City from 2021 to 2024, and previously from 2010 to 2016. He also previously served as the 16th Vice Mayor (2001–2010, 2019–2021) and City Councilor from the 2nd (South) District (1992–2001).

In October 2024, the Ombudsman dismissed Rama as mayor and permanently disqualified him from public office after finding him guilty of nepotism and grave misconduct. Rama was dismissed and permanently disqualified a second time on January 3, 2025, due to illegally awarding garbage collection contracts without going through the legally-required bidding processes.

Rama is the father of Cebu City Councilor Mikel Rama and the uncle of Cebu City South District Rep. Eduardo Rama Jr.

== Early life and career ==
Michael Lopez Rama was born on October 28, 1954, to Fernando Genson Rama and Natividad Lopez Rama. He had 12 siblings, including former Agusan Del Norte Governor and Congressman Eduardo Rama Sr., who he grew up with in the Rama Compound in Barangay Basak San Nicolas, Cebu City.

Rama graduated class valedictorian from Basak Elementary School in Basak San Nicolas, Cebu City. He attended the University of Southern Philippines and earned a pre-med degree from Velez College. He took graduate studies in law at San Beda College in Manila, passing the bar exam in 1983.

Before his entry into politics, Rama also worked as a human resource manager for the Cebu Oxygen and Acetylene Company (Coaco).

== Political career ==
=== Cebu City Councilor (1992–2001) ===
Rama began his political career in 1992 when he ran for office as City Councilor from Cebu City's 2nd (South) District as a member of Mayor Tomas Osmeña's Bando Osmeña – Pundok Kauswagan (BOPK), succeeding his uncle, veteran city councilor Clemente "Cle" G. Rama.

Rama served for three terms until 2001, during which he was also appointed chairman of the Area Vocational Rehabilitation Center II Advisory Council. During his third term, Rama was elected National President of the Philippine Councilors League (PCL).

=== Vice Mayor (2001–2010) ===
After incumbent Mayor Alvin Garcia bolted BOPK to form his own political party, Kugi Uswag Sugbo (KUSUG), Rama was tapped by former Mayor Tomas Osmeña as his running mate and vice mayoral candidate for the 2001 Cebu City local elections. The tandem won both positions, with Rama defeating KUSUG's bet, re-electionist Vice Mayor Renato Osmeña.

Rama served three terms as Vice Mayor, winning once again in 2004 and 2007, alongside Osmeña as Mayor. In 2007, during his third term as vice mayor, Rama was elected National President of the Vice Mayors' League of the Philippines (VMLP). He was also appointed chairman of several government and non-government agencies, including the city's Zoning Board, Tourism Commission, Police Coordinating and Advisory Council (PCAC), and People's Law Enforcement Board (PLEB).

Tensions brewed between Rama and Osmeña, which included Rama's criticism of Osmeña's handling of the 93-1 land swap deal between the city and the Province of Cebu and Rama allegedly being "too friendly" with Osmeña's political nemesis Cebu Governor Gwen Garcia while serving as acting mayor during Osmeña's trips to the United States for cancer treatment.

==== 2010 endorsement controversy ====
With both Osmeña and Rama both being term-limited, Rama was BOPK's heir apparent as Mayor for the 2010 elections, with Osmeña now running for congressman in the South District. However, cracks began appearing in the relationship between the two; in 2009, Osmeña accused Rama of being a "drug lord protector" after the latter allegedly meddled with a drug bust, which he later retracted.

BOPK-aligned barangay captains also issued a manifesto contesting Osmeña's choice of Rama as BOPK's 2010 mayoral bet, asking Osmeña to instead endorse his sister, Georgia Osmeña, who was also running for mayor. The call was backed by former senator Sonny Osmeña, fellow mayoral candidate and Tomas's estranged cousin, and by KUSUG councilor candidate Raymond Alvin Garcia, who Rama defeated in the 2007 vice mayoral race. Despite the controversy and past tensions, Tomas Osmeña and BOPK stood by Rama.

Rama ran his first mayoral campaign on the slogan "Bayanihan, Barangayan, Boluntarismo" (Community Spirit, Neighborhood Unity, Volunteerism). He won the 2010 elections with 210,520 votes over former mayor Alvin Garcia's 120,327 votes to become the 26th Mayor of Cebu City, with his running mate Councilor Joy Young succeeding him as vice mayor.

=== Mayor (2010–2016) ===
As mayor, Rama also served as head of several organizations, including the Sinulog Foundation, Inc. (SFI), Cultural and Historical Affairs Commission (CHAC), Area Vocational Rehabilitation Center 11 Advisory Council, Coastline Management Board (CMB), and the Adopt a Police Station Project. He was also President of the Young Lawyers Association of Cebu (YLAC) and Vice President of the Philippine Association on Voluntary Arbitration (PAVA).

Rama's first term was marked by a growing political rift with then-Congressman Osmeña over various issues, similar to the previous fallout between Osmeña and former Vice Mayor Garcia. Notable incidents included Rama conducting "loyalty checks" on Osmeña appointees, sidelining BOPK officials in favor of the opposition KUSUG during the mass oathtaking of newly elected Sangguniang Kabataan (SK) officials, and legal cases filed against Rama by BOPK allies over his allegedly indiscriminate demolition of houses along Mahiga Creek.

On June 2, 2011, Rama announced his departure from BOPK, with which he was affiliated for 13 years, while remaining a member of its national affiliate, the Liberal Party (LP). Osmeña responded that BOPK members had become dissatisfied with Rama's way of running the city government.

In 2012, Osmeña proposed to fund two new flyovers using PHP 400 million (equivalent to USD 7 million) in congressional funding that he was provided as a Department of Public Works and Highways (DPWH) allocation for the city's south district, in addition to P75 million he received from the Priority Development Assistance Fund (PDAF), commonly known as the pork barrel). Rama opposed the proposal, stating in a September 4, 2012 letter to President Benigno "Noynoy" Aquino III that flyovers were "not the ultimate solution to the traffic congestion" and that nearby businesses would be adversely affected, advocating instead for road widening and opening alternative routes. Osmeña attempted to reallocate the funding to road widening projects in the south district, which was blocked once again by Rama. Eventually, Osmeña redirected the funds to Cebu 1st district Rep. Eduardo "Eddie" Gullas, to be used on road widening projects from Carcar to Sibonga, despite a years-long dispute between the two stemming from then-Talisay City Mayor Gullas' claims over 50 hectares of the South Road Properties (SRP).

Rama subsequently formed his own political party, Team Rama, together with other BOPK defectors, to challenge Osmeña in the 2013 elections. With incumbent Councilor Edgardo Labella as his running-mate and vice mayoral candidate, Team Rama filed their certificates of candidacy with the COMELEC on October 5, 2012, now affiliated with the national opposition party United Nationalist Alliance (UNA) led by Vice President Jejomar Binay. The Rama-Labella tandem defeated Osmeña's mayoral comeback bid and unseated incumbent Vice Mayor Young, with Rama winning 217,448 votes to Osmeña's 211,072 votes, breaking BOPK's long-held electoral dominance.

==== Second term (2013–2016) ====
Rama's political rivalry with Osmeña continued throughout his second term. In 2014, Osmeña criticized Rama for taking on roles outside the typical duties of a mayor, such as acting as firefighter, police officer, and disaster reporter. In 2015, Osmeña again criticized Rama regarding the SRP—a landmark project by Osmeña in the 1990s—accusing Rama of mismanaging government funds by selling valuable SRP lots for immediate funds instead of allowing the city to benefit from their long-term revenue. Osmeña also highlighted what he described as the depletion of city funds under Rama, contrasting it with the surplus of PHP 2.4 billion (US$43.13 million) he left at the end of his term in 2010.

In November 2015, Osmeña sued Rama and 19 other city officials and employees before the Ombudsman for graft and procurement violations over the reconstruction of Carbon Market Unit 2. Osmeña alleged collusion between officials and bidders to award the PHP 167 million (US$3 million) project to Geety Realty and Development Corp. (GRDC), which was purportedly unqualified to handle government projects exceeding PHP 100 million (US$1.8 million). The complaint also claimed that the city was billed before the project's commencement, in violation of the Local Government Code's (R.A. 7160) prohibition on advance payments, and that GRDC falsified tax permits. On July 30, 2018, the Office of the Ombudsman resolved to file cases against Rama and seven others; however, this was subsequently reversed by Ombudsman Samuel Martires, who dismissed the case for lack of merit on November 8, 2021.

Rama sought a third and final consecutive term in the 2016 elections, filing his certificate of candidacy with his running mate Labella and other Team Rama's candidates on October 16, 2015. While Rama's allies won a majority of city council seats and Labella secured a second term as vice mayor, Rama lost the mayoral race to Osmeña by 33,894 votes. Rama refused to accept his loss, alleging electoral fraud and filing an election protest against Osmeña on May 22. The COMELEC granted a manual recount of 20 percent of the votes, which failed to overturn the results.

=== Hiatus from office (2016–2019) ===
On August 6, 2016, President Rodrigo Duterte named Rama a protector of drug lords. Duterte repeated the accusation in 2017. Rama denied the allegations on several occasions, stating that Duterte had been misinformed. Rama was later removed from Duterte's narco-list in 2019.

A majority of Team Rama's officials switched political parties from UNA to PDP-Laban, the new ruling party led by Duterte, on August 27, 2016. Rama was not included in the induction of new members due to his then-inclusion on Duterte's narco-list, with then-House Speaker and PDP-Laban Secretary General Pantaleon Alvarez commenting that "the crime of one [is] not the fault [of] all."

The rivalry between Rama and Osmeña persisted, with Osmeña referring to Team Rama—later renamed Barug Team Rama—as "Team Suyop" (lit. "Team Inhale", referencing Rama's drug allegations) and "Team Babag" ("Team Obstructionist"). In response, Barug city councilor Joy Pesquera filed a cyber-libel case against Osmeña over the "Team Suyop" label on May 13, 2018.

In November 2017, Team Rama rebranded as "Barug PDP-Laban" ahead of the 2019 elections. Party members announced the new name publicly but acknowledged the renaming occurred without Rama's approval, as he was still excluded from PDP-Laban. Rama questioned the decision.

On October 17, 2018, Barug members filed their candidacies for the 2019 elections. Vice Mayor Edgardo Labella, term-limited in his position, ran for mayor, while Rama ran for vice mayor. Barug won the May 13 elections decisively, with Labella unseating Osmeña, Rama returning as vice mayor for a fourth term, and Barug securing a council majority with nine of sixteen seats. Observers attributed Barug's electoral success partly to a high level of involvement by President Duterte in favor of Barug and Labella, which included sustained attacks on Osmeña and BOPK. The winning candidates were proclaimed over two-day period following election night, with the delay due to technical issues.

=== Vice Mayor and stints as Acting Mayor (2019–2021) ===
In 2019, speculation arose about a possible reconciliation and a potential 2022 team-up between Rama and Osmeña, after both aligned on several issues—most notably, their opposition to proposed changes to the Cebu Bus Rapid Transit System (CBRT) system and concerns over the alleged undue influence of Presidential Assistant for the Visayas Michael Dino on Mayor Labella. Rama dispelled the rumors in a December 13, 2019 interview, publicly reaffirming his opposition to Osmeña just four days after the latter filed a graft case against him over the 2015 sale of a 45-hectare South Road Properties (SRP) lot.

Further tensions arose between Rama and Labella, with Rama criticizing Labella's management of the city and handling of the COVID-19 pandemic response. In April 2020, Rama accused Labella of disregarding the city council's part in policymaking and attempting to run the city by executive order. Rama also questioned at least seven of Labella's executive orders, citing alleged neglect by the executive branch as a major contributor to the spread of the virus in Cebu City.

Throughout the pandemic, Rama continued to criticize Labella's leadership, with little personal communication between the two despite both publicly maintaining that they remained friends and political allies. Rama accused Labella of not being visible and active enough in the city's pandemic response, of being absent amidst a spike of cases in the city, and of concealing his own state of health during his medical leaves. In response, Labella accused Rama of playing politics—an allegation Rama denied. On February 10, 2021, Labella appointed Rama as the city's vaccine czar and chairman of the vaccination board; Rama, however, declined the title and instead referred to himself as the board's "convenor."

Labella's health condition deteriorated throughout 2021, causing him to go on medical leave a total of seven times, during which Rama served as acting mayor:

- January 20 to 22, after being hospitalized for near-fatal sepsis (blood infection) resulting from an ear infection
- February 8 to 10, while recovering from his previous ear infection
- May 31 to June 13, due to mild pneumonia
- June 9, for around 3 weeks afterward, due to sepsis
- July 14 to August 10, due to persistent cough, pneumonia, and a mild stroke
- September 2 to 7, for undisclosed reasons
- September 20 to October 8, extended to indefinite leave due to health complications

In July 2024, the city council questioned Rama's authority to preside over council meetings while serving as acting mayor, as first-ranked Councilor Dondon Hontiveros should have been acting vice mayor—and thus the council's presiding officer—while Rama was acting mayor. Rama responded that he did not receive formal communications from Labella's office regarding the latter's medical leaves.

On November 19, 2021, Labella died of sepsis resulting from pneumonia, with his most recent hospital stay lasting 23 days. Rama assumed the office of mayor the following day, November 20, with Hontiveros succeeding him as vice mayor, both taking their oath of office before Court of Appeals Associate Justice Gabriel Ingles.

=== Return as Mayor (2021–2024) ===
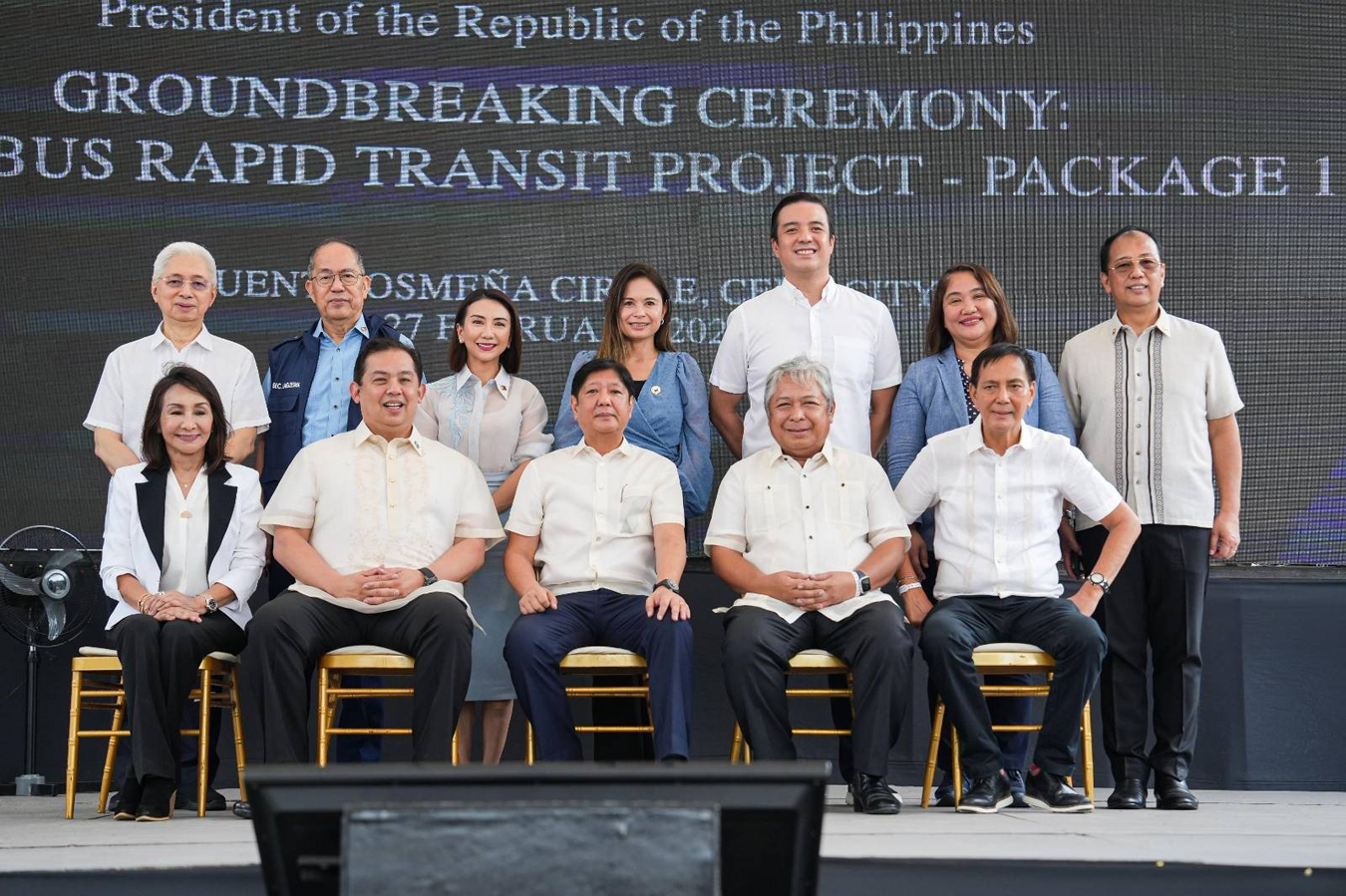
Rama in 2023 (seated, rightmost) with President Bongbong Marcos, House Speaker Martin Romualdez, Cebu Gov. Gwen Garcia, Cebu City Reps. Cutie del Mar and Edu Rama, and other national and local officials.

Rama, now a member of PDP-Laban, filed his candidacy for mayor in the May 9, 2022 elections on October 9, 2021, with majority floor leader and city councilor Raymond Alvin Garcia as his running mate. They led a coalition between Rama's Barug PDP-Laban, Garcia's KUSUG, and the newly revived Partido Panaghiusa under longtime campaign manager and former city councilor Jose "Joey" Daluz III. The Rama-Garcia tandem, which endorsed the UniTeam led by presidential candidate Bongbong Marcos and vice-presidential candidate Sara Duterte, was also endorsed by outgoing President Rodrigo Duterte on April 2, 2022. Rama defeated two city councilors to win a full term as mayor, winning 226,328 votes over BOPK candidate Margot Osmeña's 190,836 votes and independent candidate Dave Tumulak's 132,510 votes.

On July 21, 2022, Rama was elected National President of the League of Cities of the Philippines (LCP), the official organization of all the country's city mayors. He was subsequently removed from his post by the LCP National Executive Board on July 19, 2024, following his May 7 suspension from office, succeeded by LCP Executive Vice President and Quezon City Mayor Joy Belmonte. Rama initially questioned the legitimacy of the move, though he eventually relented and expressed his confidence in Belmonte.

Rama tested positive for COVID-19 on August 2, 2022. He attributed his asymptomatic status to being fully vaccinated with booster shots, encouraging others to get vaccinated as well.

On September 29, 2022, Rama was elected PDP-Laban Vice President for the Visayas during the party's 40th anniversary and general assembly held in Pasay City, having already been president of its Cebu City chapter.

On November 9, 2022, Rama denied allegations by residents of Lot 937 in Sitio San Miguel, Barangay Apas that the city government did not help them after property developer Century Horizons, represented by then-former Congressman Edgar Erice, demolished 167 households to make way for a property development. Rama said that that he was addressing the residents' requests for help, but declined to disclose what action he was taking. Many of the displaced residents were eventually relocated in 2024, with the Cebu provincial government (under Governors Junjun Davide and Gwen Garcia) providing relocation sites and financial assistance.

Former mayor Tomas Osmeña once again publicly criticized Rama during an October 21, 2023 press conference, stating he would support anyone who ran against Rama in 2025—even saying he would "rather vote for [his] dog" than for Rama. Osmeña cited the PHP 3 billion (US$54 million) spent on the still-incomplete and allegedly overpriced Cebu City Medical Center (CCMC), comparing it to the PHP 6 billion (US$108 million) he had spent to complete the South Road Properties (SRP) project during his own tenure. He further claimed that the city suffered a long-term revenue loss after Rama sold 50 hectares of SRP land to Ayala Corporation and SM Supermalls, allegedly losing PHP 6 billion in projected earnings per hectare. Osmeña also accused Rama of favoring the two corporations by reducing the Cebu Bus Rapid Transit System (CBRT) route from 25 kilometers (Bulacao to Talamban) to just 12 kilometers (SM Seaside to Ayala Center), arguing the shortened route would benefit the supermalls at the expense of city commuters. Rama declined to comment on Osmeña's criticisms.

In March 2024, Rama filed an administrative complaint before the Office of the President of the Philippines (OP) against Cebu Governor Gwen Garcia, after the latter stopped the construction of a CBRT station in front of the Cebu Provincial Capitol. Rama alleged that Garcia committed abuse of power by interfering with a national infrastructure project under the Department of Transportation (DOTr), while Garcia responded that she was protecting the cultural and historical integrity of the Capitol, a historical landmark. This resulted in Garcia resigning from PDP-Laban on May 28, citing "irreconcilable conflict" and Rama's position as PDP-Laban's Vice President for Visayas. On October 30, the OP dismissed Rama's complaint, citing insufficient evidence.

After Rama demolished two of the city's ten pedestrian overpasses in March 2024 and replace them with pedestrian underpasses, Osmeña accused Rama of incompetence, as the overpasses' demolition left the affected areas without an accessible pedestrian crossing. Osmeña highlighted that Rama previously opposed the overpasses' construction sponsored by the late Rep. Raul del Mar in favor of flared intersections with at-grade crossings, only to still not have built the first one five years later, with underpasses taking even longer to complete. Rama responded that the overpasses had become outdated and inaccessible to persons with disabilities (PWDs) with limited mobility, as well as serving as sleeping quarters for beggars and dumping grounds for human waste.

On April 11, 2024, Rama cancelled an April 2 order to relocate the Cebu City Office of Senior Citizens Affairs (OSCA), following a request from Councilor Jun Alcover. Rama said that he would investigate how he signed the memo (on the request of the City Treasurer's Office), citing the large amount of papers he had to sign daily as mayor. Rama's decision to cancel the move was praised by Alcover and OSCA Head Homer Cabaral.

On April 20, 2024, Rama ordered a fact-finding investigation after Alcover accused City Agriculture Department (CAD) Head Joelito Baclayon of negligence. Alcover, in an April 4 privilege speech, accused Baclayon of failing to prepare for El Niño and underutilizing CAD's budget from the previous year. Baclayon questioned Alcover's allegations, saying the CAD did not receive a complaint from any of the city's farmers; Alcover responded by calling Baclayon a liar, showing the media pictures of farmers' crops destroyed by the El Niño droughts. Rama initially threw his support behind Baclayon, but eventually said an investigation would be fair to Alcover while allowing Baclayon to defend himself. Following Rama's May 8 suspension, Alcover called anew for Baclayon's removal on June 14, saying Rama did not heed his advice and asking Acting Mayor Raymond Alvin Garcia to replace Baclayon. Garcia eventually replaced Baclayon as City Agriculturalist in late 2024.

==== Singapore-like vision ====
During his inaugural address on June 30, 2022, Mayor Michael Rama announced his vision for a “Singapore-like Cebu City,” inspired by a recent trip to Singapore and centered on mass transit, sustainability, infrastructure, housing, and digitalization projects. On February 13, 2023, Rama unveiled a replica of Singapore's Merlion in Carbon Market, the city's largest public market, which received mixed reactions. The "Singapore-like" vision drew criticism for allegedly lacking clear and specific targets, prioritizing large-scale projects despite limited city cash reserves, and being overly ambitious at the expense of day-to-day governance and basic service delivery.

Following official visits to Melbourne in December 2023 and Taiwan in March 2024, Rama expanded the slogan to “Singapore-like Cebu City with Melbourne features and Taiwan training.” The revised slogan was met with further criticism; editorials in local newspapers described the plans as overambitious and impractical, arguing that Cebu City should focus on becoming the best version of itself rather than emulating other cities. Cebu Governor Gwen Garcia also publicly criticized the slogan. News media also noted growing public mockery of the branding, with terms such as “Singapool-like Cebu” circulating during floods and “Singapoor-like Cebu” in the context of garbage collection issues. The slogan was widely panned online as out of touch with the city's real needs.

In July 2024, the Commission on Audit (COA), in its 2023 audit report, stated that Cebu City lacked the cash to sustain Rama's "Singapore-like" vision. The report flagged the city's income projections over the past five years as consistently “unrealistic,” calling the 2023 fiscal year “the most aggressive.”

The controversial slogan was eventually dropped on October 9, 2024, when newly assumed Mayor Raymond Alvin Garcia, on his first day in office, announced its retirement in favor of a renewed focus on Cebu City's own identity. Garcia emphasized Cebu's long history as a civilization, predating that of Singapore.

==== 2024 suspension and rift with Raymond Garcia ====
On May 8, 2024, Rama was preventively suspended for 6 months by the Ombudsman due to withholding the salaries of four city employees. Garcia assumed the post of acting mayor on May 14, replacing city administrator Collin Rosell and city assessor Maria Teresa Rosell, who were both also suspended along with Rama. He also ordered an investigation into alleged harassment against the four city employees who filed the complaint that resulted in Rama's suspension. Garcia announced that he would adopt a more diplomatic approach to the city's issues as acting mayor, compared to what he labeled as Rama's more aggressive style.

Although Rama initially affirmed on February 17 that Garcia would remain his vice mayoral candidate for 2025, he later criticized Garcia's leadership and policy direction as acting mayor with increasing frequency. Rama accused Garcia of overstepping the bounds of an acting mayor—a claim Garcia denied—and of failing to uphold a prior agreement not to interfere with Rama's policies. Garcia admitted to the growing distance between him and Rama on June 17, saying that he "no longer [felt] positive" about Rama's frequent criticisms, even as he still viewed Rama as a friend. Garcia was noticeably absent from a Barug gathering on June 12, where Rama hinted towards picking acting vice mayor Dondon Hontiveros as his 2025 running mate instead.

On August 12, Rama presented a nearly-30 minute video to allies and journalists at Casino Español de Cebu, criticizing Acting Mayor Raymond Garcia and Gov. Gwen Garcia. He opposed the non-renewal of certain city officials and employees under Garcia's acting term and raised concerns over the Cebu Port Authority and Metropolitan Cebu Water District (MCWD), following Garcia's resolution of Rama's disputes with both agencies. He accused Gov. Garcia of interfering in city affairs and violating Cebu City's autonomy, even calling for city residents to be allowed to vote for the Governor in provincial elections. Rama also questioned his exclusion from the 2024 Palarong Pambansa closing rites and criticized the city's hosting of the 22024 Pasigarbo sa Sugbo at the provincial government's request.

On September 23, Garcia was announced as party president of the newly revived KUSUG party, succeeding his father Alvin. Garcia also announced his openness to running for a full term as Mayor in 2025. Rama officially declared the end of the Barug-KUSUG coalition and his alliance with Garcia the next day, September 24.

=== 2025 mayoral campaign ===
On September 24, 2024, Rama announced Barug's lineup for the 2025 elections, notably including Liga ng mga Barangay (LnB) Cebu City President Franklyn Ong, who was BOPK's 2022 vice mayoral candidate and a former longtime BOPK member. Barug would form a coalition with BagOng Sugbo (New Cebu), a grassroots movement recently founded by Ong, to launch the Partido Barug BagOng Sugbo Team Rama coalition. They filed their candidacies on October 3, with Rama running for re-election as mayor, Hontiveros running for a full-term as vice mayor, Ong running for congress in the North District, and South District Rep. Edu Rama running for re-election.

On the same day, the Ombudsman released its September 19 ruling on Rama's case, dismissing suspended Mayor Rama from his position and permanently disqualifying him from public office. Following succession laws, Vice Mayor Garcia assumed office as mayor, taking his oath of office on October 9. The COMELEC cancelled Rama's certificate of candidacy due to his disqualification by the Ombudsman, which was reversed when Rama obtained a temporary restraining order (TRO) from the Supreme Court on October 22, keeping his name on the ballot.

On October 31, 2024, Rama announced that he would challenge Garcia's assumption as mayor, filing a case for usurpation of authority. The Ombudsman would go on to dismiss at least 8 complaints filed by Rama, his allies, and his ex-employees, upholding the Garcia's legitimacy as mayor.

On February 19, 2025, Rama announced that he withdrew support for Tingog Party List after former President Duterte endorsed Barug members on February 13. Tingog's first nominee is incumbent Rep. Yedda Romualdez, wife of House Speaker Martin Romualdez. Rama also announced his opposition to the impeachment of Vice President Sara Duterte, the former president's daughter. Speaker Romualdez, a cousin of President Bongbong Marcos, led the successful impeachment effort in the House amidst the political rivalry between the formerly-allied Marcos and Duterte political dynasties.

On April 22, 18 former city employees associated with Rama were ordered to return handheld radios previously issued by the City Disaster Risk Reduction and Management Office (CDRRMO). The CDRRMO allegedly intercepted radio communications in early April which revealed that Rama's associates were using the city-issued radios for Rama's election campaign, which would violate laws against using government resources for political purposes. Garcia warned that the people responsible had 72 hours to return the handheld radios, after which he would escalate the matter to the City Legal Office for possible legal action. Rama denied knowledge of the matter, telling Cebu Daily News that he had no idea about it.

On May 12, Rama lost to an upset victory by Archival, placing third behind Archival and Garcia. Rama's lineup lost decisively, with no candidates winning in the North District, four councilor candidates winning in the South District, and Rep. Edu Rama winning re-election. As was the case with his 2016 defeat, Rama refused to accept his loss, alleging electoral fraud, filing an election protest against Archival, and seeking a manual election recount.

== Controversies and legal issues ==
In January 2011, Rama was accused of bullying businessman and fireworks trader Bryan Lim, after allegedly destroying PHP 3 million (approximately US$60,000) in fireworks earlier seized for being sold outside of designated selling areas. Lim considered filing a case against Rama for grave abuse of authority. Lim's counsel Noel Archival argued that the fireworks' destruction was done unlawfully, and that Lim should have been allowed to donate the fireworks to the city's Sinulog festival instead.

Rama has also been repeatedly criticized for allegedly singing and talking excessively about himself and his family during events and meetings, instead of properly focusing on official business. Rama was seen singing during an official meeting with BPO company heads on a video that surfaced on Facebook dated to December 3, 2013, with the poster alleging that they lost their job because the company downsized its Cebu team after the company's boss, who had flown in from overseas to meet the mayor, said that Rama instead wasted their time with the "most expensive useless concert" they had seen.

=== COA disallowances ===
The Commission on Audit (COA) is an independent constitutional commission mandated to protect public funds from corruption through auditing the Philippine government's spending. COA has the power to disallow expenses it deems irregular, unnecessary, excessive, extravagant or illegal, and order the responsible officials to return them to public coffers, as well as flag unspent and underspent funds.

To date, COA has flagged and/or issued disallowances against the following expenses by Rama:

- 2013 disaster assistance: In June 2024, COA flagged Rama for a total of PHP 84 million (around USD 1.5 million) in calamity assistance distributed to city officials and employees on December 23, 2013, following a magnitude 7.2 earthquake and Typhoon Yolanda (international name "Haiyan") in October and November, respectively. COA said that while the funds were given with good intentions, the means of distribution was unlawful, with the budget not being sourced from the city's calamity funds and the individual grants of PHP 20,000 (US$351) per beneficiary exceeding the legal limit of PHP 15,000. Rama appealed the 30 notices of disallowances given by COA relating to the case, with COA upholding its decision and dismissing Rama's appeal on January 24, 2022.
- August 2022 Canada trip: On January 25, 2023, COA flagged as excessive nearly PHP 2 million in cash advances that were distributed for a 6-day official trip to Canada by Rama and other city officials without the approval of the Department of Interior and Local Government (DILG). The disbursed airfare of PHP 300,000 (US$5,400) per official was found to be excessive compared to the one-way airfare estimate of PHP 25,000 to 27,000 (US$439 to 474), with daily expenses allocated for 9 days even if the officials' trip lasted for only 6 days.
- September 2023 Vladivostok trip: COA, in July 2024, flagged nearly PHP 1.3 million (US$22,800) in expenses for city officials' trip to the 8th Eastern Economic Forum (EEF) in Vladivostok, Russia. Auditors reported that only 2 officials out of the 6 members of Rama's delegation—Rama himself and Councilor Jocelyn Pesquera—had clear responsibilities, and that the trip's expenses violated Presidential Executive Order No. 77 s. 2019, which mandates that travel delegations be kept to the barest minimum due to the expensive costs of foreign trips.
- 2023 unrecorded deposits and disbursements: COA flagged over PHP 609 million (US$10.67 million) in unrecorded deposits and disbursements by the city government under Rama for 2023, a 788 percent increase from 2022. City Treasurer Mare Vae Reyes claimed that the unrecorded transactions were due to a new system implemented in 2019, while admitting "lapses" in the handling of the deposits and that the 788 percent increase was "alarming."
- 2022-2023 unspent disaster funds: In its 2023 Audit Report, COA flagged PHP 1.456 billion (US$25.5 million) in unspent disaster funds for 2022 and 2023. Only 8.16 percent of the Local Disaster Risk Reduction and Management Fund (LDRRMF) Capital Outlay was utilized for both years, with a consistent pattern of low disaster fund utilization over the last five years under the Labella and Rama administrations due to what the City LDRRM Office revealed as bureaucratic red tape and procedural bottlenecks. COA's report mentioned that the underutilization of funds left city vulnerable to calamities and emergencies.
- 2024 unused CCMC equipment: COA identified and flagged 46 unused units of high-value medical equipment worth PHP 84 million (US$1.47 million) at the Cebu City Medical Center (CCMC), some purchased as early as 2020 and now out of warranty. An inspection in March 2024 found 46 unutilized units, including vital items like anesthesia machines. COA attributed this to poor planning and coordination, as the equipment was acquired anticipating a hospital completion timeline that remains unfulfilled even eight years after construction began. COA reported that the wasted equipment deprived the public of essential medical services.
- February 2023 charter day bonuses: In 2025, COA flagged the release of PHP 71.698 million (US$1.25 million) in Charter Day bonuses (PHP 15,000 each, or US$263) to officials and employees in 2023 without sufficient documentation justifying the performance of each recipient, which is legally required for such performance-based incentives. The issue raised concerns, particularly as the city government considered increasing the Charter Day bonus to PHP 35,000 (US$642) for 2025.

=== Drug protector allegations ===
In 2009, then-Vice Mayor Rama was accused by then-Mayor Osmeña of being a “drug lord protector” during a gathering of BOPK-aligned barangay captains. Independent candidate Jimboy Tiokno echoed this, linking Rama to alleged drug lord Crisostomo Llaguno. Rama filed a libel suit against Tiokno, and his family dismissed the accusations, claiming Osmeña later called it a “lapse of judgment.”

On January 15, 2014, Rama refused a surprise drug test at city hall following allegations that he was using illegal drugs., criticizing the council's resolution requiring all city officials to undergo testing. He said the council had no authority over him as mayor but eventually complied on January 23.

On August 6, 2016, President Rodrigo Duterte publicly named Rama as a protector of drug lords. Rama, woken by family after the midnight announcement, expressed sadness but said he remained supportive of Duterte's drug war and was willing to clear his name. Days later, Rama met with Philippine Drug Enforcement Agency (PDEA) Director General Isidro Lapeña but claimed the agency had no records or evidence against him, nor could they identify the drug lord he was supposedly protecting. Duterte repeated the accusation in a February 2017 speech, mistakenly referring to Rama as Cebu's governor. Rama again denied the claim, saying Duterte had been fed wrong information.

In 2018, Rama said he began receiving death threats as a result of Duterte's allegations, including a tarpaulin hung on a pedestrian overpass showing a 2016 photo of Rama alongside fellow UNA party members Albuera, Leyte Mayor Rolando Espinosa Sr. and Ronda, Cebu Vice Mayor Jonnah John Ungab, who were both murdered following drug-related allegations. Their faces were crossed out in red, with Rama's circled and tagged, “you are next.” The tarpaulin was quickly taken down, with the Cebu City Police Office (CCPO) launching an investigation.

After several failed attempts to meet Duterte, Rama finally had a brief chance meeting in March 2018, after running into presidential aide Bong Go in Davao City. Rama declined to share details, calling Duterte “cordial.” He later took another voluntary drug test in September 2018 at the Philippine National Police (PNP) Regional Office, visiting Regional Director Debold Sinas in another attempt to clear his name.

Rama was eventually removed from Duterte's narco-list in 2019, with his name absent from the list released on March 14. He thanked his supporters, while allies Raymond Garcia and Joel Garganera blamed his initial inclusion on the supposed influence of the opposition Liberal Party (LP) over the agencies behind the list.

=== Cebu Port Authority dispute ===
On July 15, 2015, during Rama's second term as mayor, the Cebu Port Authority (CPA) sued for a permanent injunction asking the Regional Trial Court (RTC) Branch 10 in Cebu City to stop the city government from exercising control over the Compañía Marítima Building, a historical landmark in an area that the city wanted to include in its development of the Carbon Public Market. The RTC granted the CPA's injunction in December 2022, during Rama's third mayoral term.

The CPA later constructed a perimeter fence around port premises as part of its port expansion project. On February 2, 2023, the city, through its Office of the Building Official (OBO), issued 15 notices of violations to the CPA over the construction work on port buildings without city permits. In August 2023, the RTC upheld its 2022 injunction in favor of the CPA, affirming the port authority's ownership and territorial jurisdiction over the Compania Maritima building and the port premises.

Rama ordered city officials to stop the port construction on March 8, 2024. The CPA refused to comply, citing its jurisdiction over the port area as an agency of the national government and the court's injunction in its favor. On March 18, the OBO filed criminal cases against the CPA before the Ombudsman, alleging 18 counts of illegal construction, as well as several other administrative charges.

On April 1, Rama ordered city officials and employees, led by City Administrator Collin Rosell, to forcibly enter the port premises and install rail fences to block off the port's expansion project. The CPA condemned the forced entry in an official statement the following day, filing complaints against Rama, Rosell, and other city officials on April 29 before the Office of the President for impermissible encroachment, “deliberate and flagrant disregard” of the CPA's authority, and “obstinate disobedience and resistance” to the court's December 2022 injunction, among other charges.

Rama asksed President Bongbong Marcos to intervene on April 5, saying that the President had to help him with the CPA issue after Rama supported the President's election in 2022. On April 19, Department of Transportation (DOTr) Secretary Jaime Bautista stressed in an interview that the city government and the CPA—an agency under the DOTr—should collaborate to resolve the issue.

The city's long-running dispute with the CPA was eventually resolved on May 28, 2024, when the city government—then headed by Acting Mayor Raymond Alvin Garcia—signed a compromise agreement with the CPA, represented by General Manager Francisco Comendador III. Garcia, in a press conference said the document will be submitted to the court trying the case for resolution. Rama, by then suspended from office, criticized Garcia's "diplomatic" approach to resolving the dispute.

=== 2021 "shadow officials" controversy ===
On November 12, 2021, an anonymous city employee sent a complaint to the DILG and Civil Service Commission (CSC), accusing then-Acting Mayor Rama of appointing irregular "shadow officials" to run the city government's 27 departments. The complaint alleged that Rama asked city employees during a November 8 flag ceremony to obey the shadow officials "otherwise risk being disciplined, replaced, or terminated," even if the said shadow officials were not properly accountable under the law due to not being the duly-appointed department heads.

Rama criticized the employee's anonymity but did not deny the appointments, insisting that his appointees were "overseers" rather than shadow officials, citing his own lack of trust in then-Mayor Labella's duly-appointed department heads. The issue was rendered moot following Labella's death on November 19, with Rama fully assuming the office of mayor and appointing his own department heads on December 6.

=== 2023-2024 dispute with MCWD and Joey Daluz ===
On October 15, 2019, then-Mayor Edgardo Labella removed the board of directors of the Metropolitan Cebu Water District (MCWD) after seven of eight local government units (LGUs) within its franchise area expressed dissatisfaction over poor service. Despite legal challenges and an interim takeover by the Local Water Utilities Administration (LWUA), Labella appointed a new board on January 6, 2020, which included Jose "Joey" Daluz III—a former city councilor, longtime Barug campaign manager, and Partido Panaghiusa president—who was elected chairman of the board on February 17.

On August 18, 2022, several MCWD employee unions launched the “LAYAS!” (Go away!) campaign, urging Daluz's resignation and submitting a position paper to Mayor Rama, the LWUA, the Office of the President, the Ombudsman, and the CSC. The paper cited a 62% revenue drop, poor operational performance, and alleged hiring favoritism and questionable contracts under Daluz's leadership. Daluz refused to step down.

Rama ordered Daluz's removal on May 18, 2023, reportedly due to his absence at an emergency meeting on El Niño. Daluz countered that Rama had not invited him and accused the mayor of usurping the MCWD board chair's authority to call meetings, asserting LGU officials had no authority over water district boards. Daluz claimed Rama's move was politically motivated on June 2, citing his earlier suggestion for Rama to run for a national post and make way for younger local leaders as having irritated Rama. He also pointed to the board's rejection of a full privatization proposal from the controversial Villar-owned PrimeWater as another of Rama's motives. Board member Jodelyn May Seno later alleged that Rama met with PrimeWater officials at his residence in February to discuss the planned takeover and full privatization of MCWD. Both Rama and PrimeWater denied the accusations.

The City Legal Office (CLO) sought graft charges against the Daluz-led board and issued termination notices on August 1, 2023. Rama named replacements on October 31. The Daluz-led board rejected his authority to do so. On November 6, Rama threatened the use of police force against the Daluz-led board if they refused to step down. Despite a LWUA order the next day declaring that Rama had no such authority, his appointees entered MCWD headquarters and held a board meeting while city-deployed SWAT personnel stood by outside.

On March 15, 2024, LWUA installed an interim board and executed a partial takeover of MCWD, dismaying both the Rama and Daluz camps. The interim board suspended Daluz and his allies for six months pending investigation of alleged procurement law violations. Both the interim board and LWUA called out Daluz for what they described was the "unauthorized and illegal use" of the MCWD headquarters' social hall for political activities in preparation for a 2025 mayoral run.

On April 29, Daluz and MCWD General Manager Edgar Donoso filed charges against Rama and five other city officials after they allegedly entered the MCWD headquarters illegally, accompanying LWUA-appointed officer-in-charge (OIC) John DX Lapid and barricading the general manager's office. Rama declined to comment but questioned their authority to file complaints while suspended. The dispute led to Lapid's resigning as OIC and taking an indefinite leave. On May 9, the Office of the Government Corporate Counsel (OGCC) ruled LWUA's takeover invalid due to the necessary conditions for a LWUA takeover not having been met, restoring the Daluz-led board.

Following Rama's suspension on May 8, Acting Mayor Raymond Garcia resolved the city's dispute with MCWD. Daluz resigned from MCWD on September 30 to pursue a 2025 mayoral bid but later ran for vice mayor as Garcia's running mate after KUSUG and Panaghiusa formed a coalition.

=== Sinulog at the SRP (2023-2024) ===
As mayor and chairperson of the Sinulog Foundation, Inc. (SFI), Rama moved the 2023 Sinulog Festival to the South Road Properties (SRP), a decision initially backed by the Cebu City Chamber of Commerce and Industry. However, the venue drew widespread criticism for being distant from the city center, lacking public transport access, and having poor site conditions, including muddy terrain and limited shelter. Critics also said the venue favored private vehicle owners over the commuting public.

Cebu Governor Gwen Garcia joined the opposition on January 9, 2023, denouncing the venue as a risk to children's health and safety, and announced the withdrawal of 10 out of 26 contingents from all over Cebu Province. Her remarks came after similar pullouts by Mandaue City Mayor Jonas Cortes, Lapu-Lapu City Mayor Junard "Ahong" Chan, and Talisay City Mayor Samsam Gullas.

Despite public backlash and Garcia's PHP PHP 20 million (US$349,000) donation offer to return the festival to the Cebu City Sports Center (CCSC), Rama insisted on holding the 2024 Sinulog at the SRP, citing CCSC's limited capacity. The decision drew renewed criticism online, including allegations that the venue shift benefited commercial interests such as Nustar Resort and Casino, and claims of possible kickbacks.

After Rama's suspension, Acting Mayor Raymond Alvin Garcia announced on August 1, 2024, that the Sinulog would return to the CCSC in 2025. Rama criticized Garcia's decision, while Garcia cited poor attendance and underwhelming ticket sales at the SRP, despite the city distributing plenty of free tickets.

The Sinulog's return to the CCSC was met with broad public approval. Participation increased from Cebu and other provinces, businesses reported improved sales, and estimated attendance surged to around four million, even prompting crowd control challenges.

=== Electoral protests ===
Rama filed electoral protests on three separate occasions, alleging electoral fraud following both of his election losses in 2016 and 2025:

- 2016 mayoral elections: After losing re-election to former mayor Osmeña, Rama filed a protest on May 22, 2016, calling his loss "statistically impossible" and accusing Osmeña and BOPK of cheating. Osmeña filed a counter-protest, also accusing Rama of cheating. On November 9, the Commission on Elections (COMELEC) Second Division ordered a manual recount of 168 clustered precincts—roughly 20% of Cebu City's 837 precincts.[37] Rama stated he was coordinating with the lawyers handling the protest of defeated 2016 vice presidential candidate Bongbong Marcos. The recount upheld Osmeña's victory, who served until 2019.
- 2018 Barangay elections: After BOPK allies won 49 of the city's 80 barangay captain posts, Rama indicated plans to file protests on behalf of his defeated allies. These did not prosper, and BOPK increased its majority to 51, with Franklyn Ong elected Liga ng mga Barangay (LnB) Cebu City chapter president and ex officio city councilor. Team Rama candidate Niña Mabatid and her allies walked out of the LnB election, alleging fraud.
- 2025 mayoral elections: After Archival emerged victorious as mayor over incumbent Mayor Garcia and Rama, Rama again alleged electoral fraud and vote-counting machine glitches, as with his 2016 defeat. Unlike Rama, Garcia conceded the race and congratulated Archival. Rama filed an electoral protest on May 22, 2025, seeking a manual recount. Archival dismissed the claims as being "based on [Rama's] imagination," noting that second-placer Garcia did not contest the outcome; Garcia urged Rama to move on. On May 27, COMELEC clarified that Rama must substantiate his fraud claims and pay PHP 25,000 (US$439) per precinct for any manual recount. Rama reaffirmed his protest on June 11 and expressed plans for a 2028 political return, despite his permanent disqualification from public office.

=== Suspensions from office ===
Before his dismissal and permanent disqualification from public office, Rama had already been suspended from office thrice:

- 2015 suspension over Labangon road projects demolition: On December 9, 2015, the Office of the President (OP) ordered a 60-day preventive suspension against Rama in response to an administrative complaint filed by Barangay Captain Victor Buendia of Labangon, Cebu City. The complaint accused Rama of culpable violation of the Constitution, grave abuse of authority, grave misconduct, and oppression, alleging that Rama illegally ordered the destruction of a PHP 300,000 (around US$5,400) center island and street lighting project funded and undertaken by the said Barangay without due process. The OP determined that Rama's actions were unjustified due to street lights and center islands not being nuisances, and that their removal should have followed appropriate legal procedures. Rama resumed his office on February 8, 2016, after the suspension ended.
- 2016 suspension over 2013 calamity aid: On April 7, 2016, the Office of the President suspended Rama, Vice Mayor Labella, and 12 City Councilors—both from Team Rama and the opposition BOPK— after finding guilty of grave abuse of authority over the controversial release of PHP 20,000 calamity aid to all City Hall employees in 2013. All suspended officials were barred from office until the end of the term on June 30, 2016, leaving only 5 out of 18 councilors in office, with Margot Osmeña serving as Acting Mayor.
- 2024 suspension: On May 8, 2024, Ombudsman Samuel Martires ordered a 6-month preventive suspension against Rama and seven other city officials over the alleged non-payment of four employees of the City Assessor's Office for nearly 10 months, since July 2023. Rama's appeals against the suspension order were denied by the Court of Appeals on May 28 and by the Ombudsman on June 20. Rama challenged the suspension before the Supreme Court as unconstitutional on August 12, with the court ordering the Ombudsman to answer Rama's petition on August 20. While the 6-month suspension would have expired on November 8, Rama was dismissed from office before then.

On all three occasions, Rama claimed that his suspensions were politically motivated.

=== Dismissal and disqualification from office ===
In January 2023, Rama was sued before the Ombudsman by Jonel Salceda (alias Inday Josa Chiongban Osmeña) for nepotism and grave misconduct, accusing Rama of appointing his brothers-in-law, Elmer and Gomer Mandanat, to positions under the Office of the Mayor and the CCMC from January to December 2022. On September 10, 2024, during Rama's 6-month suspension over the non-payment of city employees' salaries, Rama's legal team denied rumors about an impending dismissal due to the nepotism case, subsequently filing a Motion for Clarification with the Ombudsman to seek clarity on the case.

The Ombudsman announced on September 25, 2024, that it had found probable cause in Rama's nepotism case for three violations of the Anti-Graft and Corrupt Practices Act, which it intended to elevate to court. Later that day, Rama's legal team announced their intent to contest the Ombudsman's resolution.

On October 3, 2024, the day Rama and Barug filed their candidacies for the 2025 elections, the Ombudsman released its September 9 ruling finding then-suspended Mayor Rama guilty of nepotism and grave misconduct, dismissing him from office, permanently banning him from any future government employment, and forfeiting his retirement benefits.

The COMELEC also disqualified Rama from the 2025 elections by ordering that all candidates who are disqualified from public office be removed from the ballot, a move which also included dismissed Mandaue Mayor Jonas Cortes and dismissed Albay Governor Noel Rosal. The Supreme Court consolidated the appeals of Rama, Cortes, and Rosal into a single case, reversing their disqualifications with a temporary restraining order (TRO) against the COMELEC on October 22 after the officials argued that the Ombudsman's disqualification is not yet final and executory due to being subject to appeal. The TRO ensured that all three candidates stayed on their respective ballots.

On December 2, 2024, after what would have been the end of Rama's 6-month suspension, Rama attempted to defy his dismissal and report back to work at City Hall, despite Garcia having already succeeded him as mayor. Rama attended the flag ceremony and appeared cordial with Garcia, walking out after Garcia referred to Rama as the former Mayor. Rama then spoke to journalists, asserted that he was still the duly-elected mayor, and called Garcia a fake mayor. Rama then attempted to enter his old office in the Executive Building, which had been padlocked by Garcia for security reasons. Tensions further escalated after Rama's vehicle, which was parked in the parking slot reserved solely for the mayor's use, was clamped by the Cebu City Transportation Office (CCTO). Rama's supporters shouted at the uniformed CCTO personnel and attempted to prevent them from leaving. Garcia dismissed the issue, stating that security threats came not from Rama himself, but rather from his associates who had allegedly violated security on previous occasions.

On February 19, 2025, the Cebu City Legal Office (CLO) issued a demand letter giving Rama 24 hours to return a Toyota HiAce Super Grandia owned by the city government, previously issued to Rama as an official vehicle. Rama refused to comply, going to City Hall on February 21, confronting CLO head Santiago Ortiz Jr., and condemning the demand letter as "tyranny and oppression." The city later filed a police blotter report at the Waterfront Police Station on February 26, with Garcia saying that the city was reviewing possible legal remedies, including carnapping charges. Rama said that he would be willing to return the van, although he insisted that he was still the rightful mayor and that his return of the van should not be seen as waiving his claim to the office. The city government later dropped the carnapping charges against Rama after he turned the vehicle over to Vice Mayor Hontiveros on February 28, albeit without signing the formal turnover paperwork.

On March 17, 2025, the Ombudsman ordered Rama dismissed as mayor and permanently disqualified from public office for the second time, after finding him guilty of awarding garbage collection contracts in December 2021 without going through the legally-required bidding processes for private contractors. Also dismissed were Leizl Calamba, Lyndon Basan, Conrado Ordesta III, Janeses Ponce, and Dominic Diño, members of the city's Bids and Awards Committee. The Ombudsman's decision was based on a complaint filed by Jundel Bontuyan in August 2023.

On April 1, Rama posted bail of PHP 270,000 (US$4,700) for his nepotism case following his legal team's discovery of an arrest warrant against him in San Carlos, Negros Occidental on March 11.

== Electoral history ==
To date, Rama ran in every local election since 1992, for a total of 12 elections. More detailed lists of candidates and votes in each election may be found in the respective election's article.

Electoral history of Michael L. Rama
Year	Office Constituency	Party (Note: Filipino local politicians more commonly campaign in their constituencies based on local parties and alliances, rather than on their national parties. It is also common for local parties and alliances to switch affiliations to another national party, especially following a change in presidential administration.)		Main opponent (Note: The listed main opponent is either the victorious candidate (in an election defeat) or the second-ranked candidate (in a victory). No main opponent is listed for positions with multiple officeholders, e.g. City Councilor.)		Votes for Rama					Result	Ref
Year	Office Constituency	Local	National	Name	Party	Total	%	Swing	Mgn. (Note: For offices with only one winner (e.g. Mayor), margins shown are over the main or winning opponent. For offices with multiple winners (e.g. City Council), margins shown are over the highest-ranked losing candidate.)	P.	Result	Ref
1992	City Councilor; Cebu City—2nd	BOPK	Lakas-NUCD	—N/a		—N/a	—N/a	—N/a	—N/a	—N/a	Won	
1995	City Councilor; Cebu City—2nd	BOPK	Lakas-NUCD	—N/a		—N/a	—N/a	—N/a	—N/a	—N/a	Won	
1998	City Councilor; Cebu City—2nd	BOPK	PROMDI	—N/a		—N/a	—N/a	—N/a	—N/a	—N/a	Won	
2001	Vice Mayor; Cebu City	BOPK	PROMDI	Renato V. Osmeña (Incumbent)	KUSUG	—N/a	—N/a	—N/a	—N/a	1st	Won	
2004	Vice Mayor; Cebu City	BOPK	Lakas-CMD	Ramiro Madarang	KUSUG	249,256	—N/a	—N/a	—N/a	1st	Won	
2007	Vice Mayor; Cebu City	BOPK	Lakas-CMD	Raymond Alvin Garcia	KUSUG	218,241	—N/a	—N/a	—N/a	1st	Won	
2010	Mayor; Cebu City	BOPK	Liberal	Alvin Garcia	KUSUG	210,520	58.42%	—N/a	25.03%	1st	Won	
2013	Mayor; Cebu City	BARUG	UNA	Tomas Osmeña	BOPK	215,425	50.70%	-7.72%	1.4%	1st	Won	
2016	Mayor; Cebu City	BARUG	UNA	Tomas Osmeña	BOPK	232,925	46.60%	-4.1%	-6.80%	2nd	Lost	
2019	Vice Mayor; Cebu City	BARUG	PDP-Laban	Mary Ann De los Santos	BOPK	261,685	51.91%	+5.31%	5.29%	1st	Won	
2022	Mayor; Cebu City	BARUG	PDP-Laban	Margarita Osmeña	BOPK	239,656	40.85%	-11.06%	6.35%	1st	Won	
2025	Mayor; Cebu City	BARUG	PDP-Laban	Nestor Archival	BOPK	120,124	20.57%	-20.28%	-23.29%	3rd	Lost	

== Personal life ==
Rama is an early riser, preferring to wake up as early as 5:30 AM and work eight to twelve hours a day. He is also known to be an avid singer, sometimes singing during events and speeches. One of Rama's favorite songs is The Greatest Love of All, which he would occasionally incorporate into his speeches.

In August 2023, Rama denied rumors that traveled to the United States for cancer treatment. The supposed official purpose of his trip was to receive a Lifetime Achievement Award from the "America Excellence Awards" (AEA). Observers, however, found the award unusual, noting that the AEA—purportedly an American organization—had awarded Rama despite his being a Filipino citizen, that most of its awardees were also Filipinos, and that the organization solicited nominations through its website, unlike most reputable award-giving bodies.

=== Family and relationships ===
Rama is a member of the Rama family, a prominent political dynasty from Cebu City. He was previously married to lawyer Araceli Lim Francisco (annulled 2000), with whom he has two children, activist Micheline and lawyer Mikel, the latter of who was elected City Councilor in 2025. Cebu City 2nd (South) District Rep. Eduardo Rama Jr. is Rama's nephew.

From 2004 to 2015, Rama was in a relationship with fellow lawyer, city councilor, and longtime political ally Jocelyn "Joy" Pesquera. In 2015, speculation emerged about an affair between Rama and Catbalogan Mayor Stephany Uy-Tan (married to Samar 1st District Rep. Stephen James Tan), whom Rama invited to join him and his family for a photo onstage after his speech during his July 4 State of the City Address. Pesquera later confirmed a connection between the alleged affair and her breakup with Rama.

On October 28, 2021, Rama married former city hall employee Malou Jimenez Mandanat in a civil ceremony, and on October 24, 2024, in a church wedding officiated by Cebu Archbishop José S. Palma. Rama and Mandanat have one child together.

=== Ancestry ===
Ancestors of Mike Rama

8. Gabriel "Abi" Raffiñan y Buzón
4. Vicente Rama
18. Laurente Ramas
9. Engilberta "Iya Bita" Ramas y Enguio
38. Ramón Enguio
19. Juana Enguio
39. Teodora Mangila
2. Fernando G. Rama
5. Catalina A. Genson
1. Michael L. Rama
3. Natividad Lopez

== Honors and awards ==
Rama is a recipient of the following honors and awards:

- People Manager of the Year for the public sector category, given by the People Management Association of the Philippines (PMAP) as its first award in the said category, September 2014;
- Doctor in Philosophy with a major in Transformative Leadership, honoris causa, given by Northwestern Christian University, January 2023;
- Lifetime Achievement Award, given by the American Excellence Awards, August 2023;
- Hall of Fame Awardee, given by San Beda College of Law on its 75th anniversary, November 2023.

== See also ==
- List of people from Cebu
- Mayor of Cebu City
- Cebu City Council

Political offices
Preceded by Renato Osmeña	Vice Mayor of Cebu City; June 30, 2001 - June 30, 2010	Succeeded by Joy Augustus Young
Preceded by Jesus C. Cruz	National President, Vice Mayors League of the Philippines; 2007 - June 30, 2010	Succeeded by Henry Dy
Preceded by Tomas Osmeña	Mayor of Cebu City; June 30, 2010 - June 30, 2016	Succeeded by Tomas Osmeña
Preceded by Edgardo Labella	Vice Mayor of Cebu City; June 30, 2019 - Nov. 23, 2021	Succeeded by Dondon Hontiveros
Preceded by Edgardo Labella	Mayor of Cebu City; Nov. 23, 2021 - Oct. 3, 2024	Succeeded by Raymond Alvin Garcia
Preceded by Evelio Leonardia	National President, League of Cities of the Philippines; July 21, 2022 - July 19, 2024	Succeeded by Joy Belmonte
Party political offices
New political party	Party Leader of Partido Barug; 2012 - present	Incumbent
Preceded by Ben Evardone	Partido Demokratiko Pilipino; Vice President for Visayas; September 29, 2022 - present	Incumbent
