= 2010 Cebu City local elections =

Election in Cebu City, Philippines on 2010

2010 Cebu City mayoral election
- May 10, 2010
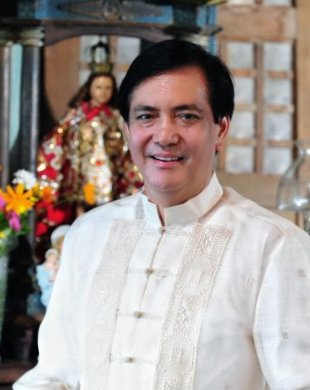

Nominee	Michael Rama	Alvin Garcia
Party	Liberal	Nacionalista
Running mate	Joy Augustus Young	Rodolfo Cabrera
Popular vote	210,520	120,327
Percentage	58.42	33.39
Mayor before election
Tomas Osmeña
Liberal
Elected Mayor
Michael Rama
Liberal

Local elections were held in Cebu City on May 10, 2010 within the Philippine general election. Registered voters of the city elected candidates for the following elective local posts: mayor, vice mayor, district representatives, and eight councilors for each district—there are two legislative districts in the city.

== Mayoralty and vice mayoralty elections ==
=== Mayor ===
Tomas Osmeña, the incumbent, was term-limited after serving for three consecutive terms. Vice mayor Michael Rama ran for the first time as the Mayor of Cebu City. Rama defeated 9 of his election rivals, including former Mayor Alvin Garcia, Osmeña's sister Georgia Osmeña and former Senator John Henry Osmeña.

Cebu City mayoral election
Party	Candidate	Votes	%
Liberal	Michael Rama	210,520	58.42
Nacionalista	Alvin Garcia	120,327	33.39
Lakas–Kampi	Georgia Osmeña	16,620	4.61
Independent	John Henry Osmeña	8,178	2.27
PGRP	Salvador Solima	1,867	0.52
Independent	Crisologo Saavedra	1,171	0.32
Independent	Rodolfo Laconza	471	0.13
Independent	Cristituto Abangan	437	0.12
Independent	Anastacio Dela Cruz	423	0.12
Independent	Fermiliano Dapitan	324	0.09
Total votes		360,338	100.00
Margin of victory		90,193	25.03

=== Vice Mayor ===
Michael Rama, the incumbent, was term-limited after serving for three consecutive terms. Former city councilor and former PROMDI party-list representative Joy Augustus Young ran for the first time as the Vice Mayor of Cebu City and defeated 7 of his election rivals.

Cebu City Vice mayoral election
Party	Candidate	Votes	%
Liberal	Joy Augustus Young	226,736	66.25
Nacionalista	Rodolfo Cabrera	59,990	17.53
Independent	Rico Palcuto	23,074	6.74
LDP	Serafin Rama Jr.	19,164	5.60
Lakas–Kampi	Emmanuel R. Pacquiao	8,034	2.35
Independent	Jessica V. Go	3,473	1.01
Independent	Crescente Busalla	965	0.28
PGRP	Jovencio Talite Jr.	817	0.24
Total votes		342,253	100.00
Margin of victory		166,746	48.72

== District representatives ==
=== 1st District ===
Raul del Mar, the incumbent, was term-limited after serving for three consecutive terms. His daughter, Rachel Marguerite del Mar, ran for the first time as the representative of Cebu City's 1st congressional district. Del Mar defeated 7 of her rivals including Lahug Barangay Captain Mary Ann de los Santos.

2010 Philippine House of Representatives election in the 1st District of Cebu City
Party	Candidate	Votes	%
Liberal	Rachel Marguerite del Mar	98,501	58.49
Nacionalista	Mary Ann de los Santos	58,492	34.73
PGRP	Jacinto Del Mar	5,555	3.30
Independent	Isabelo Osmeña Sr.	2,405	1.43
Independent	Francisco Ashley Acedillo	2,052	1.22
Independent	Florencio Villarin	1,082	0.64
Independent	Juan Arenasa	179	0.11
Independent	Miguel Selim	151	0.09
Total votes		168,417	100.00
Margin of victory		40,009	23.76

=== 2nd District ===
Antonio Cuenco, the incumbent, was term-limited after serving for three consecutive terms. Mayor Tomas Osmeña ran for the first time as the representative of Cebu City's 2nd legislative district. Osmeña defeated 4 of his rivals including businessman Jonathan Guardo.

2010 Philippine House of Representatives election in the 2nd District of Cebu City
Party	Candidate	Votes	%
Liberal	Tomas Osmeña	125,575	64.44
Nacionalista	Jonathan Guardo	67,652	34.72
Independent	Makilito Mahinay	600	0.31
Independent	Edgar Abadiano	593	0.30
Independent	Lea Ong	457	0.23
Total votes		194,877	100.00
Margin of victory		57,923	29.72

== City Council ==
Number indicates the ballot number assigned for the candidates by the Commission on Elections (COMELEC).

=== By ticket ===
==== Liberal Party/Bando Osmeña-Pundok Kauswagan ====
Cebu City North District (1st District)
#	Name	Party
3.	Sisinio Andales	Liberal
5.	Alvin Arcilla	Liberal
8.	Ma. Nida Cabrera	Liberal
10.	Alvin Dizon	Liberal
15.	Lea Ouano-Japson	Liberal
16.	Edgardo Labella	Liberal
24.	Augustus Pe Jr.	Liberal
29.	Noel Eleuterio Wenceslao	Liberal

Cebu City South District (2nd District)
#	Name	Party
2.	Rodrigo Abellanosa	Liberal
3.	Raul Alcoseba	Liberal
10.	Roberto Cabarrubias	Liberal
11.	Ronald Cuenco	Liberal
12.	Jose Daluz III	Liberal
28.	Margarita Osmeña	Liberal
29.	Richard Osmeña	Liberal
32.	Eduardo Rama Jr.	Liberal

==== Nacionalista Party/Kugi Uswag Sugbu ====
Cebu City North District (1st District)
#	Name	Party
1.	Lemar Alcover	Nacionalista
6.	Zenica Arcilla	Nacionalista
11.	Danilo Fernan	Nacionalista
12.	Raymond Alvin Garcia	Nacionalista
13.	Joel Garganera	Nacionalista
14.	Jerry Guardo	Nacionalista
21.	Paul Melendez	Nacionalista
25.	Fritz Quiñanola	Nacionalista

Cebu City South District (2nd District)
#	Name	Party
6.	Ruben Baculi	Nacionalista
9.	Junas Cabarrubias	Nacionalista
14.	Raul del Rosario Jr.	Nacionalista
19.	Eugenio Gabuya Jr.	Nacionalista
23.	Danilo Lim	Nacionalista
26.	Jose Navarro	Nacionalista
30.	Anne Marie Palomo	Nacionalista
34.	Danilo Teves	Nacionalista

==== Lakas–Kampi ====
Cebu City North District (1st District)
#	Name	Party
7.	Emma Cabrera	Lakas
18.	Mariter Madrona	Lakas
19.	Alexander Mancao	Lakas
23.	Ramon Perley Pandaan	Lakas

Cebu City South District (2nd District)
#	Name	Party
1.	Nilo Abella	Lakas
7.	Fe Bilar	Lakas
13.	Bliss del Mar	Lakas
15.	Jose Delgado	Lakas
24.	Silvano Maranga	Lakas
35.	Eleuterio Ubanan	Lakas

==== Laban ng Demokratikong Pilipino ====
Cebu City South District (2nd District)
#	Name	Party
16.	Ma. Leonora Durante	LDP
17.	Rajeni Dy	LDP
25.	Sulpecio Medequillo	LDP

==== Philippine Green Republican Party ====
Cebu City North District (1st District)
#	Name	Party
2.	Almer Andalahao	PGRP
9.	Feliciano Camomot	PGRP
18.	Demetrio English	PGRP
27.	Josephine Sol	PGRP

Cebu City South District (2nd District)
#	Name	Party
8.	Jocelyn Caballes	PGRP
20.	Daniel Go	PGRP
21.	Victoriano Go	PGRP
27.	Eugene Orbita	PGRP
33.	Alfie Sian	PGRP

==== Independents ====
Cebu City North District (1st District)
#	Name	Party
4.	James Ang	Independent
17.	Cresistomo Llaguno	Independent
20.	Roberto Medina	Independent
22.	Timoteo Emilio Oppus	Independent
26.	Felicisimo Rupinta	Independent
28.	James Philip Tionko	Independent

Cebu City South District (2nd District)
#	Name	Party
4.	Enrique Almaras	Independent
5.	Jose Jonathan Asas	Independent
22.	Nestor Legaspi Jr.	Independent
31.	Rabbi Rabanes	Independent

=== Summary ===
Party	Votes	%	Seats
Liberal Party	1,612,453	65.05	16
Nacionalista Party	623,993	25.17	0
Lakas Kampi CMD	88,994	3.59	0
Philippine Green Republican Party	46,704	1.88	0
Laban ng Demokratikong Pilipino	6,834	0.28	0
Independent	99,896	4.03	0
Ex officio seats			2
Total	2,478,874	100.00	18

=== By district ===
==== 1st District ====
City Council election at Cebu City's 1st district
Party	Candidate	Votes	%
Liberal	Edgardo Labella	105,338	9.15
Liberal	Augustus Pe Jr.	97,546	8.48
Liberal	Alvin Arcilla	91,096	7.91
Liberal	Sisinio Andales	85,880	7.46
Liberal	Lea Ouano-Japson	84,615	7.35
Liberal	Alvin Dizon	82,274	7.15
Liberal	Noel Eleuterio Wenceslao	79,247	6.89
Liberal	Ma. Nida Cabrera	77,018	6.69
Nacionalista	Joel Garganera	63,400	5.51
Nacionalista	Raymond Alvin Garcia	53,818	4.68
Nacionalista	Lemar Alcover	47,864	4.16
Nacionalista	Fritz Quiñanola	46,955	4.08
Nacionalista	Jerry Guardo	46,388	4.03
Nacionalista	Danilo Fernan	35,859	3.12
Independent	James Ang	32,756	2.85
Independent	Felicisimo Rupinta	28,823	2.50
Lakas	Emma Cabrera	16,817	1.46
Nacionalista	Paul Melendez	15,300	1.33
Independent	Cresistomo Llaguno	13,222	1.15
Nacionalista	Zenica Arcilla	13,201	1.15
Lakas	Alexander Mancao	8,946	0.78
Independent	James Philip Tionko	4,761	0.41
Independent	Roberto Medina	4,161	0.36
PGRP	Josephine Sol	3,402	0.30
Lakas	Mariter Madrona	2,938	0.26
Lakas	Ramon Perley Pandaan	2,706	0.24
Independent	Timoteo Emilio Oppus	2,315	0.20
PGRP	Feliciano Camomot	2,195	0.19
PGRP	Almer Andalahao	2,101	0.18
Total votes		1,150,942	100.00

==== 2nd District ====
City Council election at Cebu City's 2nd district
Party	Candidate	Votes	%
Liberal	Rodrigo Abellanosa	137,676	10.37
Liberal	Margarita Osmeña	126,765	9.55
Liberal	Eduardo Rama Jr.	121,340	9.14
Liberal	Jose Daluz III	114,603	8.63
Liberal	Raul Alcoseba	113,370	8.54
Liberal	Ronald Cuenco	102,743	7.74
Liberal	Richard Osmeña	97,274	7.33
Liberal	Roberto Cabarrubias	95,668	7.20
Nacionalista	Eugenio Gabuya Jr.	65,026	4.90
Nacionalista	Jose Navarro	47,591	3.58
Nacionalista	Danilo Lim	45,081	3.39
Nacionalista	Junas Cabarrubias	33,538	2.53
Nacionalista	Ruben Baculi	31,475	2.37
Nacionalista	Danilo Teves	28,550	2.15
Nacionalista	Raul del Rosario Jr.	25,126	1.89
Nacionalista	Anne Marie Palomo	24,821	1.87
Lakas	Bliss del Mar	24,073	1.81
PGRP	Jocelyn Caballes	23,762	1.79
Lakas	Nilo Abella	15,294	1.15
PGRP	Daniel Go	5,959	0.45
Lakas	Jose Delgado	5,616	0.42
Lakas	Silvano Maranga	5,219	0.39
Independent	Nestor Legaspi Jr.	4,640	0.35
Lakas	Fe Bilar	4,230	0.32
PGRP	Victoriano Go	4,009	0.30
Independent	Enrique Almario	3,527	0.27
LDP	Ma. Leonora Durante	3,454	0.26
Lakas	Eleuterio Ubanan	3,155	0.24
PGRP	Eugene Orbita	2,988	0.23
Independent	Rabbi Rabanes	2,968	0.22
Independent	Jose Jonathan Asas	2,723	0.21
LDP	Sulpecio Medequillo	1,698	0.13
LDP	Rajeni Dy	1,682	0.13
PGRP	Demetrio English	1,228	0.09
PGRP	Alfie Sian	1,060	0.08
Total votes		1,375,523	100.00
