= Alvin Garcia =

Filipino politician and lawyer

The Honorable Alvin Garcia
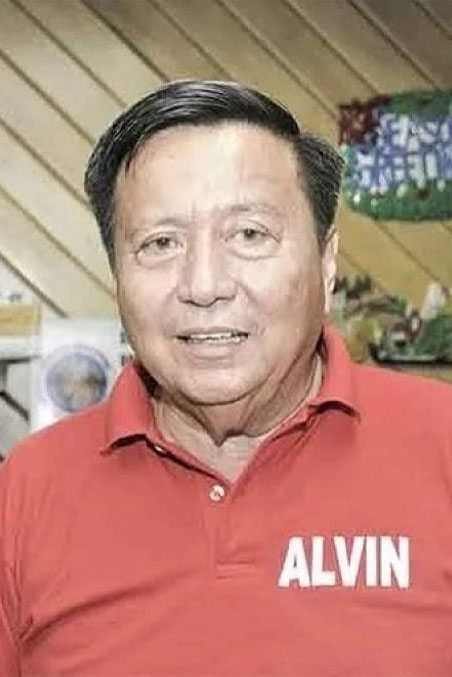

25th Mayor of Cebu City
- In office June 30, 1995 – June 30, 2001
- Vice Mayor: Renato Osmeña Sr.
- Preceded by: Tomas Osmeña
- Succeeded by: Tomas Osmeña

14th Vice Mayor of Cebu City
- In office February 2, 1988 – June 30, 1995
- Mayor: Tomas Osmeña
- Preceded by: Joseph Sy Gaisano
- Succeeded by: Renato Osmeña Sr.

Personal details
- Born: Alvin Biaño Garcia; June 29, 1946 (age 80) Cebu City, Cebu
- Party: Kugi Uswag Sugbo (local; 2000–present); Partido Federal ng Pilipinas (national; 2024–present)
- Other political affiliations: PDP-Laban (2016–2024); UNA (2012–2016); Nacionalista (2009–2010); GO (2006–2007); KNP (2003–2004); KAMPI (2000–2001); Lakas–CMD (1990s); BOPK (local; 1988–2000)
- Spouse: Trinidad Neri Garcia
- Children: 3, including Raymond Alvin
- Relatives: Garcia family
- Occupation: Politician
- Profession: Lawyer, teacher

Alvin Biaño Garcia (born June 29, 1946) is a Filipino politician, lawyer, and former teacher who served as the 25th Mayor of Cebu City from 1995 to 2001. He also served as its 14th Vice Mayor from 1988 to 1995 alongside then-Mayor Tommy Osmeña.

Garcia is the founder of Kugi Uswag Sugbo (KUSUG), a local political party based in Cebu City, and the father of former Cebu City Mayor Raymond Alvin Garcia. Both are third father-son tandem to have become mayor after the Dutertes (Ramon and Ronald) and Osmeñas (Sergio "Serging" Jr. and Tomas), as well as the second father-son tandem to become vice mayor.

== Early life and career ==
Garcia is the son of Jesus Paras Garcia Sr. and Severiana "Ever" Biaño. His father is the brother of former Cebu Governor Pablo Paras Garcia, making him the cousin of former governor Gwendolyn Garcia.

He was admitted to the Philippine Bar on March 10, 1971. He later founded the J.P. Garcia & Associates along with his brother, Jesus Jr.

== Political career ==
=== Vice mayor (1988–1995) ===
Garcia started his political career as vice mayor to Tomas Osmeña in 1988. Both served for two consecutive terms until Osmeña gave way to Garcia to run as mayor in the 1995 elections. He also served as president of the Vice Mayors' League of the Philippines from 1992 to 1995.

=== Mayor (1995–2001) ===
He was first elected as mayor in 1995. He went on to serve for two terms until 2001 when he was defeated by Osmeña, his political mentor, who challenged him in the 2001 elections.

The defeat of the Bando Osmeña – Pundok Kauswagan (BO–PK) candidate in the local councilors league election started the rift between Garcia and Osmeña which was then followed by the latter's public criticisms.

== Post-mayoral career ==
In the 2004 elections, Garcia sought to reclaim his old post as mayor but was defeated again by then mayor Osmeña by almost 40,000 votes. He declined to run for the same position in the 2007 elections but ran in the 2010 elections after expressing confidence in the automated elections. He was once again defeated but this time by then vice mayor Michael Rama who was chosen by Osmeña to succeed him.

When Rama bolted Osmeña's BO–PK group in 2011 and sought re-election as mayor, Garcia and his group KUSUG endorsed him, Edgardo Labella as vice mayor, Annabelle Rama as 1st district representative and Aristotle Batuhan as 2nd district representative. Garcia's political group later allied itself with Team Rama (now Partido Barug), a political party formed by Rama.

Garcia ran for the position of representative of Cebu City's 1st district against incumbent Raul del Mar in the 2016 elections but was overwhelmingly defeated by more than 70,000 votes.

== Controversies ==
=== F.E. Zuellig asphalt deal ===
Garcia was embroiled in a controversy involving F.E. Zuellig, the Philippine distributor of asphalt brand Bitumex, after signing a contract that gave an advance payment to the said company for 600 metric tons of bitumen that was not delivered.

=== Fair Elections Act violation ===
In 2006, criminal charges were filed against Garcia by the Commission on Elections for alleged violation of Section 6 of Republic Act No. 9006, otherwise known as the Fair Elections Act, after going over the allowable limit of political advertisement in a newspaper during the 2004 elections. This stemmed from the complaint filed by Osmeña pertaining to the political advertisements that ran in SunStar Cebu from April 26 to May 2, 2004.

=== Condominium project anomaly ===
The Office of the Ombudsman in 2013 filed two counts of graft against Garcia for the alleged overpricing of the construction of a condominium project in 1997 when he was serving as mayor. The Sandiganbayan later dismissed the charges against Garcia and members of the Pre-qualification Bids and Awards Committee due to "inordinate delay" that "violated their constitutional right to speedy disposition of cases."

== Personal life ==
Garcia is married to Trinidad "Ninette" Neri Garcia. They have three children: Jess Anthony, Jerald Mark and Raymond Alvin.

He also has a 5 percent share of SunStar Publishing, Inc., a media company based in Cebu City.

Political offices
Preceded by Joseph Sy Gaisano	Vice Mayor of Cebu City; 1988–1995	Succeeded by Renato Osmeña Sr.
Preceded by Tomas Osmeña	Mayor of Cebu City; 1995–2001	Succeeded by Tomas Osmeña
