= 2007 Cebu City local elections =

Election in Cebu City, Philippines on 2007

2007 Cebu City mayoral election
- May 14, 2007
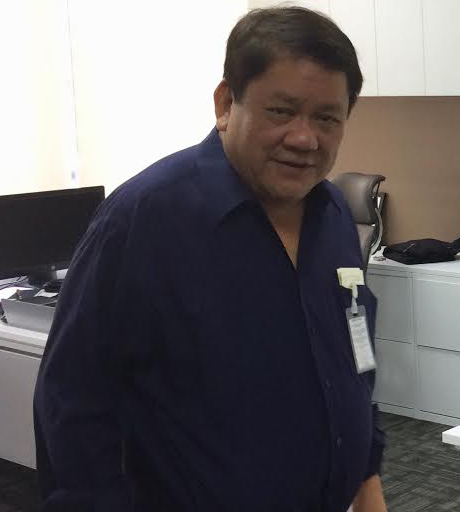

Nominee	Tomas Osmeña	Mary Ann de los Santos
Party	Lakas	UNO
Running mate	Michael Rama	Raymond Alvin Garcia
Popular vote	195,236	114,243
Mayor before election
Tomas Osmeña
Lakas–CMD
Elected Mayor
Tomas Osmeña
Lakas–CMD

Local elections were held in Cebu City on May 14, 2007, within the Philippine general election. Registered voters of the city elected candidates for the following elective local posts: mayor, vice mayor, district representatives, and eight councilors for each district. There are two legislative districts in the city.

== Mayoralty and vice mayoralty elections ==
=== Mayor ===
Cebu City mayoral election
Party	Candidate	Votes	%
Lakas	Tomas Osmeña (incumbent)	195,236	
UNO	Mary Ann de los Santos	114,243	
Independent	Lea Ong	318	
Independent	Wendell Lope	113	
Independent	Florentino Saballa	0	
Total votes		309,910	100.00
Lakas hold			

=== Vice mayor ===
Cebu City Vice mayoral election
Party	Candidate	Votes	%
Lakas	Michael Rama (incumbent)	218,241	
Kusug	Raymond Alvin Garcia	82,640	
Independent	Cristituto Abangan	976	
Total votes		300,881	100.00
Lakas hold			

== District representatives ==
=== 1st District ===
2007 Philippine House of Representatives election in the 1st District of Cebu City
Party	Candidate	Votes	%
Lakas	Raul del Mar (incumbent)	122,988	
Independent	Florencio Villarin	7,153	
Independent	Juan Arenasa	627	
Total votes		130,768	100.00
Lakas hold			

=== 2nd District ===
2007 Philippine House of Representatives election in the 2nd District of Cebu City
Party	Candidate	Votes	%
Lakas	Antonio Cuenco (incumbent)	91,711	
UNO	Jonathan Guardo	70,538	
Total votes		162,249	100.00
Lakas hold			

== City Council elections ==
=== By district ===
==== 1st District ====
City Council election at Cebu City's 1st district
Party	Candidate	Votes	%
Lakas	Hilario Davide III	101,989	N/A
Lakas	Nestor Archival	100,049	N/A
Lakas	Edgardo Labella	96,696	N/A
Lakas	Sylvan Jakosalem	95,031	N/A
Lakas	Christoper Alix	88,404	N/A
Lakas	Edwin Jagmoc	86,506	N/A
Lakas	Lea Ouano-Japson	76,530	N/A
Lakas	Augustus Pe Jr.	72,377	N/A
UNO	Danilo Fernan	54,577	N/A
UNO	Fritz Quiñanola	48,423	N/A
UNO	George Chang	21,283	N/A
UNO	Arthur Abregonde	20,310	N/A
UNO	Laureano Rogero	19,320	N/A
Independent	Ely Tumulak	16,112	N/A

==== 2nd District ====
City Council election at Cebu City's 2nd district
Party	Candidate	Votes	%
Lakas	Rodrigo Abellanosa	107,791	N/A
Lakas	Eduardo Rama Jr.	99,291	N/A
Lakas	Gerardo Carillo	96,525	N/A
Lakas	Arsenio Pacaña	96,359	N/A
Lakas	Raul Alcoseba	93,378	N/A
Lakas	Jose Daluz III	87,375	N/A
Lakas	Roberto Cabarrubias	76,108	N/A
Lakas	Richard Osmeña	75,571	N/A
UNO	Jose Navarro	60,011	N/A
UNO	Danilo Lim	49,368	N/A
UNO	Jocelyn Caballes	43,600	N/A
UNO	Salvador Solima	38,338	N/A
UNO	Jenikin Cabanit	37,461	N/A
UNO	Bienvenido Baring Jr.	33,156	N/A
UNO	Rodrigo Jabellana	28,418	N/A
UNO	Eugenio Gabuya Jr.	19,970	N/A
Independent	Nestor Legaspi Jr.	9,781	N/A
Independent	Enrico Balansag	6,856	N/A
Independent	Nevilve Campos	6,325	N/A
