= Tomas Osmeña =

Vice Mayor of Cebu City (since 2025)

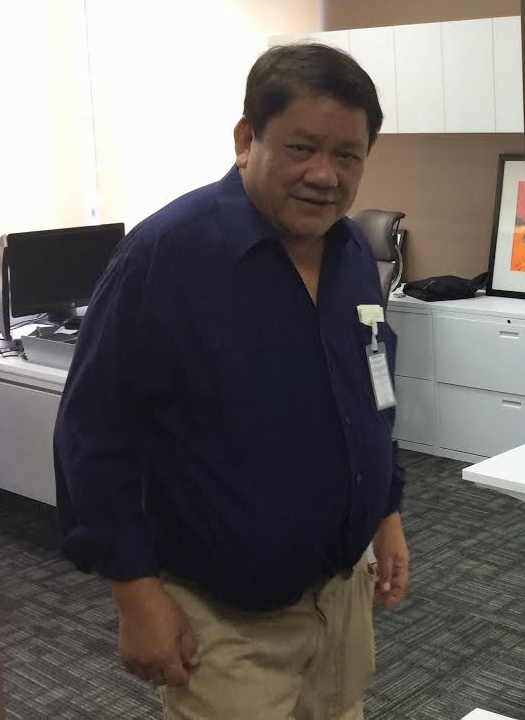
- Osmeña in 2016

21st Vice Mayor of Cebu City
- Incumbent
- Assumed office June 30, 2025
- Mayor: Nestor Archival
- Preceded by: Dondon Hontiveros

24th Mayor of Cebu City
- In office June 30, 2016 – June 30, 2019
- Vice Mayor: Edgardo Labella
- Preceded by: Michael Rama
- Succeeded by: Edgardo Labella
- In office June 30, 2001 – June 30, 2010
- Vice Mayor: Michael Rama
- Preceded by: Alvin Garcia
- Succeeded by: Michael Rama
- In office February 2, 1988 – June 30, 1995
- Vice Mayor: Alvin Garcia
- Preceded by: Antonio Veloso
- Succeeded by: Alvin Garcia

Member of the House of Representatives from Cebu City's 2nd district
- In office June 30, 2010 – June 30, 2013
- Preceded by: Antonio Cuenco
- Succeeded by: Rodrigo Abellanosa

Personal details
- Born: July 26, 1948 (age 78) Cebu City, Cebu, Philippines
- Party: Liberal (national; 2009–2018; 2024–present); BOPK (local; 1987–present)
- Other political affiliations: LDP (2018–2024); PROMDI (1997–2004); Lakas–CMD (1991–1997; 2004–2009); Independent (1988–1991)
- Spouse: Margarita L. Vargas (m. 1983)
- Children: Ramon Miguel Osmeña
- Parents: Sergio Osmeña Jr. (father); Lourdes de la Rama (mother)
- Relatives: Sergio Osmeña (grandfather); Serge Osmeña (brother); John Henry Osmeña (cousin); Lito Osmeña (cousin)
- Education: Xavier University – Ateneo de Cagayan (BS); University of California, Los Angeles
- Occupation: Politician
- Profession: Agriculturist
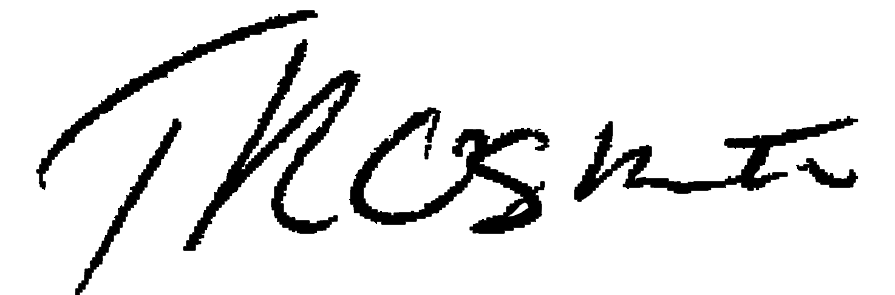
- Signature

Tomas "Tommy" de la Rama Osmeña (Tagalog: [toˈmɐs ʔɔsˈmɛɲa]; born July 26, 1948) is a Filipino politician serving as the 21st Vice Mayor of Cebu City since 2025. He previously served as Cebu City's 24th mayor thrice: 1987 to 1995, 2001 to 2010, and 2016 to 2019. He also served as Congressman representing the 2nd district of Cebu City from 2010 to 2013. He is a grandson of former Philippine president Sergio Osmeña.

He is also considered as the founder of Bando Osmeña – Pundok Kauswagan, a local political group run by the Osmeña family of Cebu.

== Early life and education ==
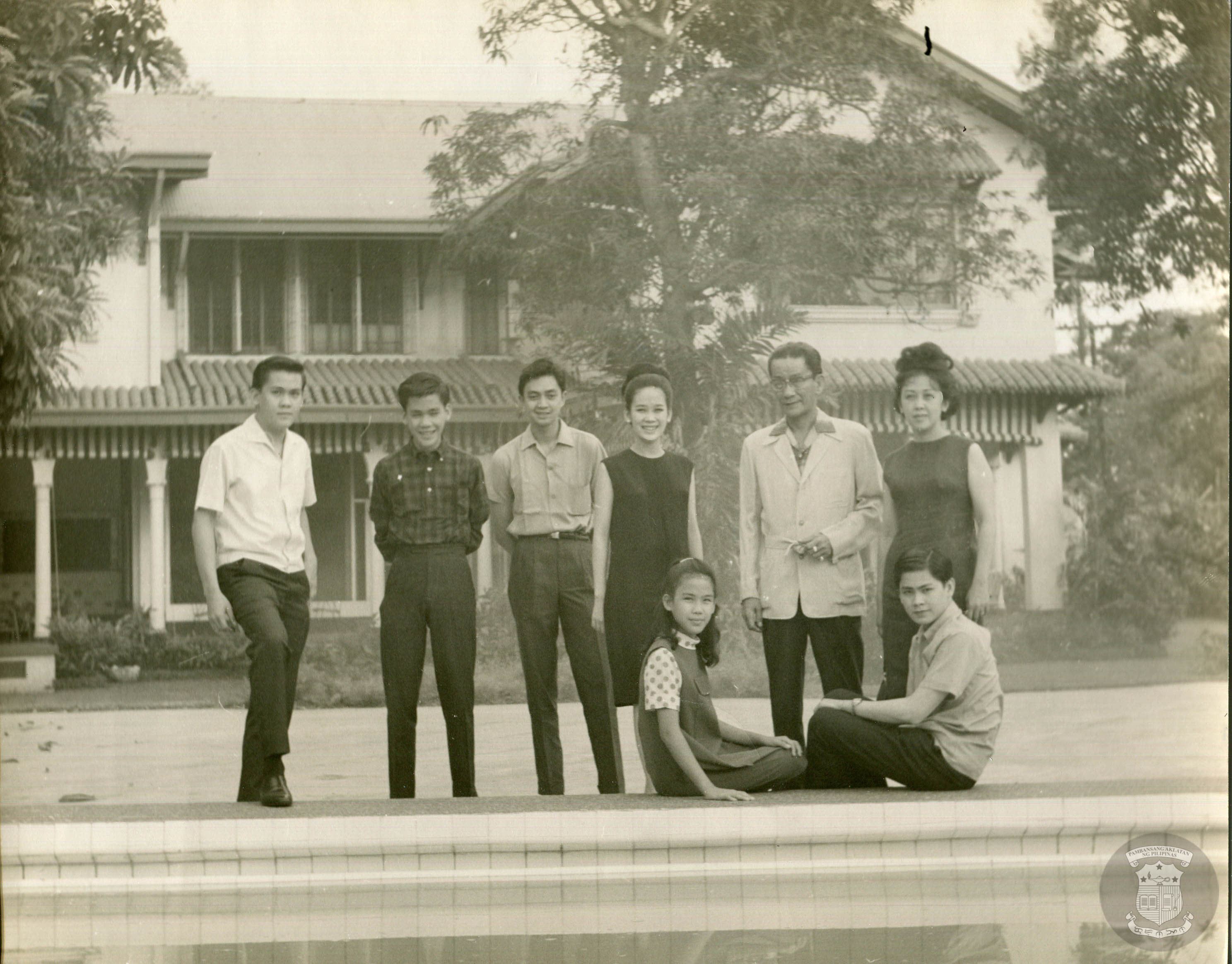
Tommy Osmeña (2nd from left) with his family in Cebu City.

Osmeña is the son of Senator Sergio Osmeña, Jr. and Lourdes de la Rama-Osmeña of Negros Occidental. He is the fourth among five siblings, namely former Senator Sergio III, Maria Victoria, Esteban and Georgia. His father, the son of former Philippine President Sergio Osmeña, was a politician from Cebu having served as Governor of Cebu, Mayor of Cebu City and Senator while his mother was the daughter of former Senator Esteban dela Rama, founder of the Dela Rama Steamship Company, the country's largest shipping firm in the 1950s.

He grew up in Metro Manila where he got to study in La Salle Green Hills until first year high school in which he failed his Tagalog and Catechism classes. "I couldn’t stand those two things," he said in an interview and eventually transferred to Sacred Heart School for Boys in Cebu.

Among his siblings, he was the only one to finish secondary school in the Philippines after declining the offer to study in the United States. He finished Bachelor of Science in Agricultural Economics from Xavier University - Ateneo de Cagayan in Cagayan de Oro and went on for further graduate studies in Finance, Management and International Trade at the University of California, Los Angeles.

During his father's campaign for President in the 1969 elections, he would be mingling with the crowd and trade stories with anyone in the sorties according to his sister Maria Victoria "Minnie" Osmeña. Years later in 1972, his family had to leave Cebu after martial law was declared by Philippine President Ferdinand Marcos, who also defeated his father in 1969. He stayed in exile in the United States for 15 years.

== Early career ==
In 1972, while staying in the United States, Osmeña worked as vice president in his father's Los Angeles-based sales company, SEROS, Inc., then as financial analyst for Foreign Credit Insurance Association, the operating arm of the Export-Import Bank of United States wherein he was engaged in the political and economic play of the export credit accounts of a number of major US banks and exporters across 12 western states. He also served as vice president of Apex Realty and Developers in California.

He got involved as well in several civic organizations and was elected as vice president of the while he was in Los Angeles, California. He was given seven awards from different Filipino organization including an award by the Philippine-American Council of Los Angeles "for outstanding service to the Filipino-American community in LA."

== Mayor of Cebu City (1988–1995) ==
Upon returning to Cebu in 1987, he ran for Mayor of Cebu City against Antonio R. Veloso and defeated him despite not having a backing of a party or an endorsement coming from a national official. In his first term, he became the Chairman of the Metro Cebu Development Project (MCDP) where he was able to secure over PHP 2 billion-worth of foreign assisted projects for Metro Cebu.

In 1988, he was awarded as one of the Ten Outstanding Young Men in the Philippines in the field of Public Service, together with then Pangasinan 1st District Congressman Oscar Orbos, by the Philippine Jaycees and the Gerry Roxas Foundation, Inc.

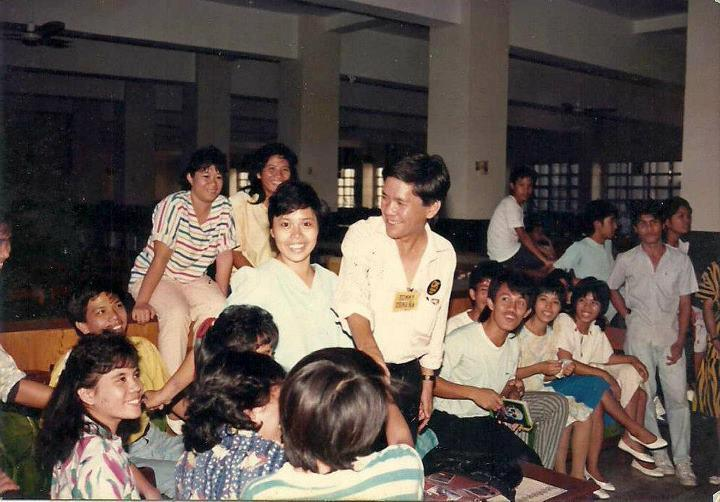
Osmeña during his campaign in 1988

In 1990, he was elected as the National Executive Vice President of the League of Cities of the Philippines (LCP) and later on, was also elected on mass motion as its President from 1992 to 1995.

During his term as mayor, Cebu City received Galing Pook Awards by the Galing Pook Foundation namely Tax Computerization (1993–1994).

In the 1992 elections, he was re-elected to office together with his candidate for Vice Mayor Alvin Garcia and fifteen of the sixteen slots for councilor in the Cebu City Council. He was also elected as the Chairman of the Regional Development Council for Central Visayas on his second term.

After serving for two terms, he gave way and endorsed his vice mayor, Alvin Garcia to run for his place in the 1995 elections. Garcia went on to win for two terms.

== Mayor of Cebu City (2001–2010) ==
While Garcia was mayor, Osmeña publicly criticized his aggressive push of a controversial $500 million investment scheme in which Garcia also responded by publicly calling Osmeña "stupid". When Garcia declared his candidacy for a third term in 2001, Osmeña decided to challenge his former vice mayor in the 2001 Cebu City local elections. Osmeña won by a slim margin of 3,060 votes.

During his second stint as mayor, he was faced with several issues:

=== Vigilante killings ===
The series of vigilante-style killings in Cebu City started in December 2004 and the victims are mainly those people who have criminal records. Between 2004 and 2006 in Cebu City, 168 people with criminal records were killed.

Osmeña said of a series of killings of suspected criminals, "I’m not behind it. I will say I inspired it. I don’t deny that." It was suspected that the vigilante group involved is the so-called "Hunters' Team" which Osmeña formed to go after criminals.

=== South Reclamation Project ===
He called then Talisay City Mayor Eduardo Gullas a landgrabber for staking a claim over 1.44 hectares of the South Reclamation Project (SRP). Then Talisay City Attorney Aurora Econg vowed to question any special patents or title that will be issued to Cebu City.

SRP Manager Nigel Paul Villarete dismissed Econg's claims that Talisay City was not claiming ownership, only jurisdiction.

Osmeña insisted that they were indeed after the ownership of the 1.44 hectare portion of the SRP.

The Cebu City Government was expected to pay PHP 1.528 Billion, a portion of the interest, to the Land Bank of the Philippines (LBP), conduit for the Japan Bank for International Cooperation (JBIC). Cebu City officials then blamed difficulties in getting titles and delays in marketing the 295 hectare SRP on the Talisay City Government, which was disputing Cebu City's application for the titling of the said reclaimed land.

The Cebu City Government entered into a joint venture with Filinvest in 2009. The Cebu City Government was expected to receive 10% of the gross income from the joint venture net of the 7% marketing fees.

=== Talisay cityhood ===
In August 2004, the Cebu City Government, under the administration of Osmeña, filed a case against Talisay City for alleged irregularities in its becoming a chartered city. The municipality first applied for cityhood in 1998 and was granted a charter in 2001. Talisay City counsel Aurora Econg testified possessing supporting documents showing that Talisay's cityhood is legal and official. Jurisdiction issues were raised by Cebu City when Talisay City claimed a 53.44-hectare portion of the project, claiming that it had encroached on the reclaimed land.

Talisay City, however, made the claim after the SRP was completed and ready for sale to investors. Osmeña then severed sister-city ties with Talisay City to keep the entire SRP intact.

The Department of Environment and Natural Resources (DENR), which conducted the survey, said the municipal boundary monument MBM 30 is located before km. 10 of the SRP just after the second bridge as one approaches Cebu City from Talisay.

On May 10, 2006, the Court of Appeals dismissed Osmeña's petition to nullify the cityhood of Talisay. The court pointed out that the "belated action" raises questions as to its motive. The 17-page decision penned by Associate Justice Apolinario D. Bruselas Jr. of the court's 18th Division, declared that Republic Act 8979, the law converting Talisay into a component city, "does not suffer from any constitutional or statutory infirmities".

=== Health ===
In March 2002, Osmeña collapsed due to hypertension which required him for a surgery and 2 months of rest. He was later treated for aneurysm at the Massachusetts General Hospital in Boston. In May 2007, he underwent a minor operation due to swollen thigh because of punctures from an angiogram.

== House of Representatives (2010–2013) ==
After serving for three terms as Mayor of Cebu City, Osmeña ran for Congressman representing the second district of Cebu City in the 2010 elections with vice mayor Michael Rama as candidate for Mayor, former councilor Joy Augustus Young for Vice Mayor and Rachel Marguerite del Mar as Congressman for the first district of Cebu City. He won by 57,923 votes against Jonathan Guardo of KUSUG. Osmeña was sworn in as the 3rd Congressman representing the second district of Cebu City on noon of June 30, 2010.

As a member of the 15th Congress, Osmeña authored 5 bills, 1 of which became a law, and co-authored 46 bills & resolutions. Below are the bills that he authored:

- House Bill 3152 which declares December 25–31 and January 1 as special non-working holidays.
- House Bill 4737 which converts the Babag-Sudlon I road in Cebu City into a national road and appropriating funds therefor.
- House Bill 4738 which converts the Tabunan-Sinsin road in Cebu City into a national road and appropriating funds therefor.
- House Bill 4795 which redefines "business" for local government tax purposes, amending section 131(D) of Republic Act No. 7160, as amended, otherwise known as the Local Government Code of 1991.
- House Bill 5775 which creates six (6) additional branches of the Municipal Trial Court in cities and an additional branch of the Regional Trial Court in the 7th judicial region to be stationed at the City of Cebu, further amending Batas Pambansa Bilang 129, otherwise known as the Judiciary Reorganization Act of 1980, as amended, and appropriating funds therefor. (Became into law as Republic Act No. 10570 on May 22, 2013)

Osmeña was the vice chairperson of committee on Appropriations and committee on Economic Affairs. He also served as member of the majority of committees on Information and Communications Technology; Legislative Franchises; National Defense and Security; Trade and Industry; and Transportation.

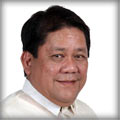
Osmeña during the 15th Congress

As Congressman, Osmeña was provided with a PHP 400 million Department of Public Works and Highways (DPWH) allocation for the south district of Cebu City on top of his PHP 75 million Priority Development Assistance Fund commonly known as pork barrel.

He initially allocated the said funds for two new flyovers in Cebu City but was opposed by then Mayor Michael Rama who said that it is "not the ultimate solution to the traffic congestion" in a letter to then President Noynoy Aquino. Rama also said that it would affect the businesses in nearby areas.

Due to Rama's opposition to the construction of flyovers, Osmeña decided to shift the fund to road concreting projects in the south district of Cebu City but was still opposed by Rama. Osmeña eventually decided to realign the said fund to the 1st district of Cebu to spend for road widening from Carcar to Sibonga.

=== Voting record ===
Here are some of the laws that passed in the 15th Congress and on how Osmeña voted on it during the third & final reading:

Republic Act (House Bill)	Short title	Long title	Vote	Ref
R.A. 10149 (HB 4067)	GOCC Governance Act of 2011	An Act to Promote Financial Viability and Fiscal Discipline in Government-Owner or -Controlled Corporations and to Strengthen the Role of the State in its Governance and Management to Make them More Responsive to the Needs of Public Interest and for Other Purposes	Yes	
R.A. 10153 (HB 4146)	Synchronization of the Elections and the Term of Office of the Elective Officials of the Autonomous Region In Muslim Mindanao (ARMM) with those of the National and other Local Officials	An Act Providing for the Synchronization of the Elections in the Autonomous Region in Muslim Mindanao (ARMM) with the National and Local Elections, and for Other Purposes	No	
R.A. 10156 (HB 4357)	Conferring Upon A Member of the Sangguniang Bayan, Sangguniang Panlungsod and Sangguniang Panlalawigan the Appropriate Civil Service Eligibility	An Act Conferring Upon a Member of the Sangguniang Bayan, Sangguniang Panlungsod and Sangguniang Panlalawigan the Appropriate Civil Service Eligibility	Yes	
R.A. 10157 (HB 3826)	Kindergarten Education Act	An Act Institutionalizing the Kindergarten Education into the Basic Education System and Appropriating Funds Therefor	Yes	
R.A. 10165 (HB 4481)	Foster Care Act Of 2011	An Act to Strengthen and Propagate Foster Care for Abandoned and Neglected Children with Special Needs, and Providing Appropriations Therefor	Yes	
R.A. 10173 (HB 4115)	Data Privacy Act Of 2011	An Act Protecting Individual Personal Data in Information and Communications Systems in the Government and in the Private Sector, Providing Penalties in Violation Thereof, and For Other Purposes	Yes	
R.A. 10175 (HB 5808)	Cybercrime Prevention Act of 2012	An Act Defining Cybercrime, Providing for the Prevention, Investigation, Suppression and the Imposition of Penalties Therefor and For Other Purposes	Yes	
R.A. 10176 (HB 4330)	Arbor Day Act of 2012	An Act Reviving the Observance of Arbor Day by Vesting in Provincial, City and Municipal Governments the Responsibilities for Celebrting the Day for Tree Planting as an Annual Event	Yes	
R.A. 10344 (HB 5932)	Risk Reduction And Preparedness Equipment Protection Act	An Act Penalizing the Unauthorized Taking, Stealing, Keeping or Tampering of Government Risk Reduction and Preparedness Equipment, Accessories and Similar Facilities	Yes	
R.A. 10353 (HB 0098)	Anti-Enforced or Involuntary Disappearance Act of 2012	An Act Defining and Penalizing Enforced or Involuntary Disappearance and For Other Purposes	Yes	
R.A. 10354 (HB 4244)	Responsible Parenthood, Reproductive Health And Population And Development Act Of 2011	An Act Providing for a Comprehensive Policy on Responsible Parenthood, Reproductive Health, and Population and Development, and For Other Purposes	Abstain	
R.A. 10361 (HB 6144)	Domestic Workers Act	An Act Instituting Regulatory Policies for Domestic Work Thereby Establishing Standards of Protection to Promote the Welfare of Domestic Workers	Yes	
R.A. 10366 (HB 5509)	Polling Center Accessibility Act Of 2011	An Act Mandating the Use of Highly Accessible Polling Places for Persons with Disabilities, Senior Citizens and Expectant Mothers	Yes	
R.A. 10367 (HB 3469)	Requiring All Registered Voters Whose Biometrics Have Not Been Captured To Appear Before The Election Officer Of Their Place Of Registration For Purposes Of Having Their Photographs, Fingerprints And Signatures Captured Through The Method Of Biometrics	An Act Requiring All Registered Voters whose Biometrics have Not Been Captured to Appear before the Election Officer of their Place of Registration for Purposes of Having their Photographs, Fingerprints, and Signatures Captured through the Method of Biometrics, For Purposes of Ensuring that the Automated Fingerprint Identification System (AFIS) can be Utilized to Cleanse the Records of Double or Multiple Registrants	Yes	
R.A. 10368 (HB 5990)	Compensation Act To Victims Of Human Rights Violations	An Act Providing Compensation to Victims of Human Rights Violations during the Marcos Regime, Documentation of Said Violations, Appropriating Funds Therefor, and For Other Purposes	Yes	
R.A. 10533 (HB 6643)	Enhanced Basic Education Act Of 2012	An Act Enhancing the Philippine Basic Education System by Strengthening its Curriculum and Increasing the Number of Years for Basic Education, Appropriating Funds Therefor and For Other Purposes	Yes	
R.A. 10586 (HB 4244)	Anti-Drunk and Drugged Driving Act of 2013	An Act Penalizing Persons Driving Under the Influence of Alcohol, Dangerous Drugs, and Similar Substances and For Other Purposes	Yes	
R.A. 10601 (HB 6548)	Agricultural and Fisheries Mechanization (AFMech) Law	An Act Promoting Agricultural and Fisheries Mechanization Development in the Country	Yes	
R.A. 10611 (HB 6474)	Food Safety Act of 2013	An Act to Strengthen the Food Safety Regulatory System in the Country to Protect Consumer Health and Facilitate Market Access of Local Foods and Food Products, and for Other Purposes	Yes	
R.A. 10612 (HB 6860)	Broadening The Coverage Of The Science And Technology Scholarship Program, Amending For The Purpose Republic Act No. 7687	An Act Broadening the Coverage of the Science and Technology Scholarship Program, Amending for the Purpose Republic Act No. 7687, Otherwise Known as the "Science and Technology Act of 1994," as Amended	Yes	
R.A. 10620 (HB 6529)	Toy and Game Safety Labeling Act of 2013	An Act Providing for Toy and Game Safety Labeling and Appropriating Funds Therefor	Yes	

=== Rift with Mike Rama ===
During a gathering of barangay captains in March 2009, Osmeña accused then vice mayor Michael "Mike" Rama as a "drug protector" for intervening in a police operation on November 29, 2008 at the home of an alleged drug suspect Crisostomo Llaguno. Rama defended himself saying that he only warned the police under Supt. Jonathan Abella of Cebu City Intelligence Branch, because they had no search warrant against Llaguno. After Rama's call, the police returned the sacks of money they seized from Llaguno's home.

Despite this, Osmeña still reiterated his endorsement for Rama even if 56 barangay captains in Cebu City signed a manifesto endorsing Osmeña's wife Margot. His sister Minnie was also floated as an alternative candidate to Rama but did not materialized.

Rama, his anointed successor, won by a margin of 90,193 votes in the 2010 elections against former Cebu City Mayor Alvin Garcia, who was also a former partymate of Osmeña before their falling out leading to the 2001 elections.

A few months into Rama's term, Osmeña accused Rama of bullying Brian Lim, owner of Pyroworks Pyrotechnic Perfection, for not giving him a warning before PHP 3 million worth of their pyrotechnics were destroyed. These fireworks were found being sold outside South Road Properties which was identified as the designated area. Lim was a regular fireworks donor to the city for the Sinulog Festival.

When Rama refused to give financial assistance or relocation site to the displaced families in Mahiga Creek citing that it would encourage more squatters, its residents sued him and three other city government officials before the Ombudsman-Visayas office. The complainants were aided by Pagtambayayong Foundation headed by Francisco "Bimbo" Fernandez, Osmeña's city administrator during his term and were also provided with PHP 5,000 financial assistance per family by Osmeña even if Mahiga Creek is located in the north district. Rama criticized Osmeña for not being able to solve the issue in the latter's nine-year tenure as Mayor.

== Mayor of Cebu City (2016–2019) ==
On October 15, 2015, Osmeña, along with his vice mayoralty candidate Nestor Archival and candidates for councilor filed their certificates of candidacies before the Cebu City COMELEC for the 2016 elections. He was challenging Rama who defeated him by 5,928 votes in the 2013 elections. Joining Osmeña was his former nemesis turned ally Mary Ann de los Santos running as councilor, who was allied with then Mayor Mike Rama but left Rama's group Team Rama and joined Osmeña's BOPK after she was removed from the committee in-charge of reconstructing the Cebu City Medical Center. De los Santos also ran against Osmeña for the mayoralty post in the 2007 elections.

In the 2016 elections, Osmeña defeated Rama by 33,894 votes and was proclaimed as Mayor of Cebu City on May 10, 2016 however, his running-mate Archival was defeated by reelectionist Vice Mayor Edgardo Labella.

On May 14, 2019, he was defeated by Edgardo Labella. Labella led the mayoral race with 265,738 votes, followed by Osmeña with 246,813 votes.

=== Legal issue ===
Ombudsman Samuel Martires, in a 13-page Resolution dated February 29, 2024, penalized Osmeña with of a one-year suspension for obstruction of justice. It "shall be converted to a FINE in the amount equivalent to his basic salary for one (l) year," the Office ruled. The grave misconduct complaint was filed on August 30, 2018 by Cebu City Police Office, Police Senior Superintendent Royina Marzan Garma, based on the release of Amaca, Apparece and Cuevas from the Parian Police Station on August 24, 2018.

== Vice Mayor of Cebu City (since 2025) ==
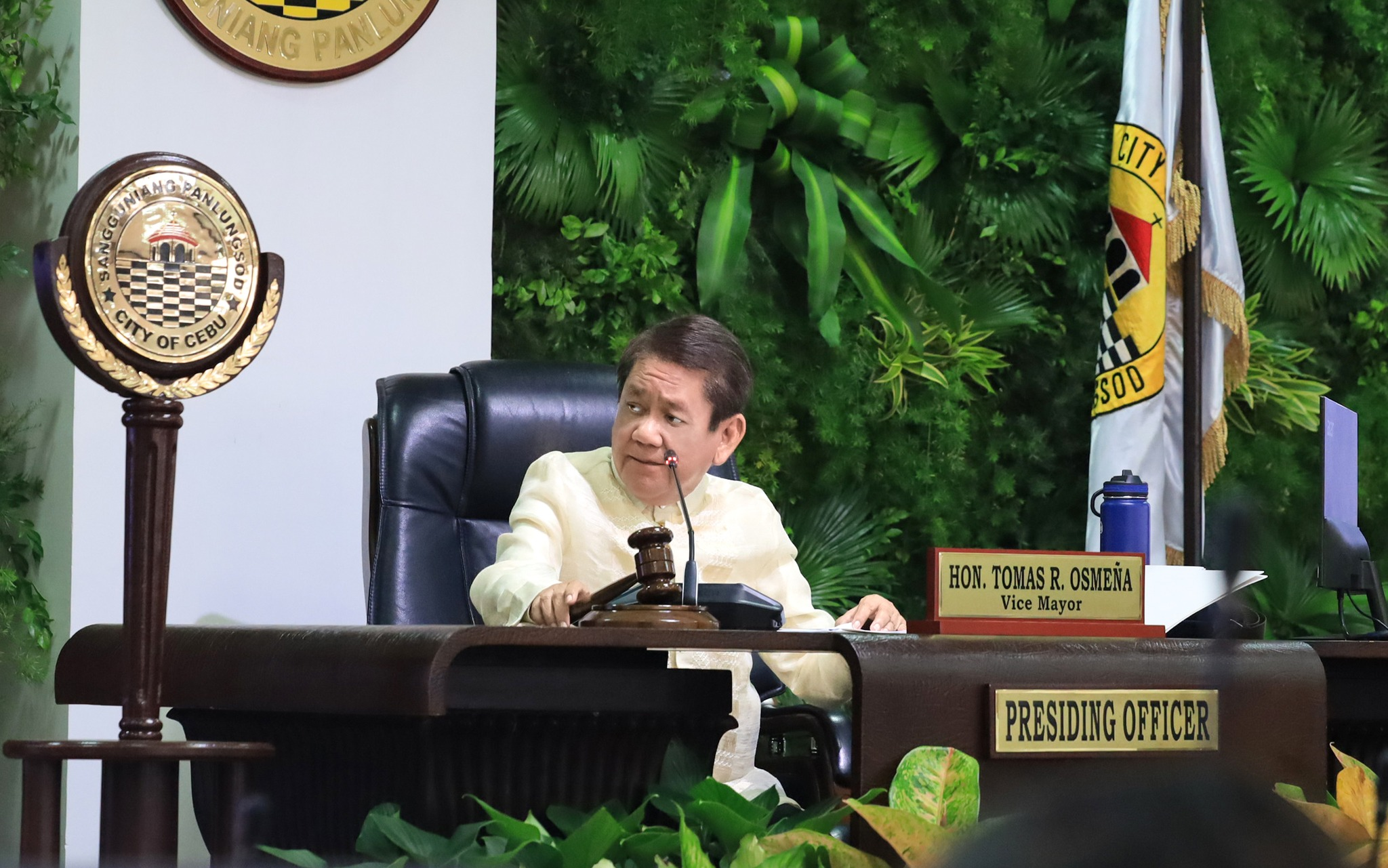
Osmeña as Cebu City Vice Mayor (July 2025)

== Personal life ==
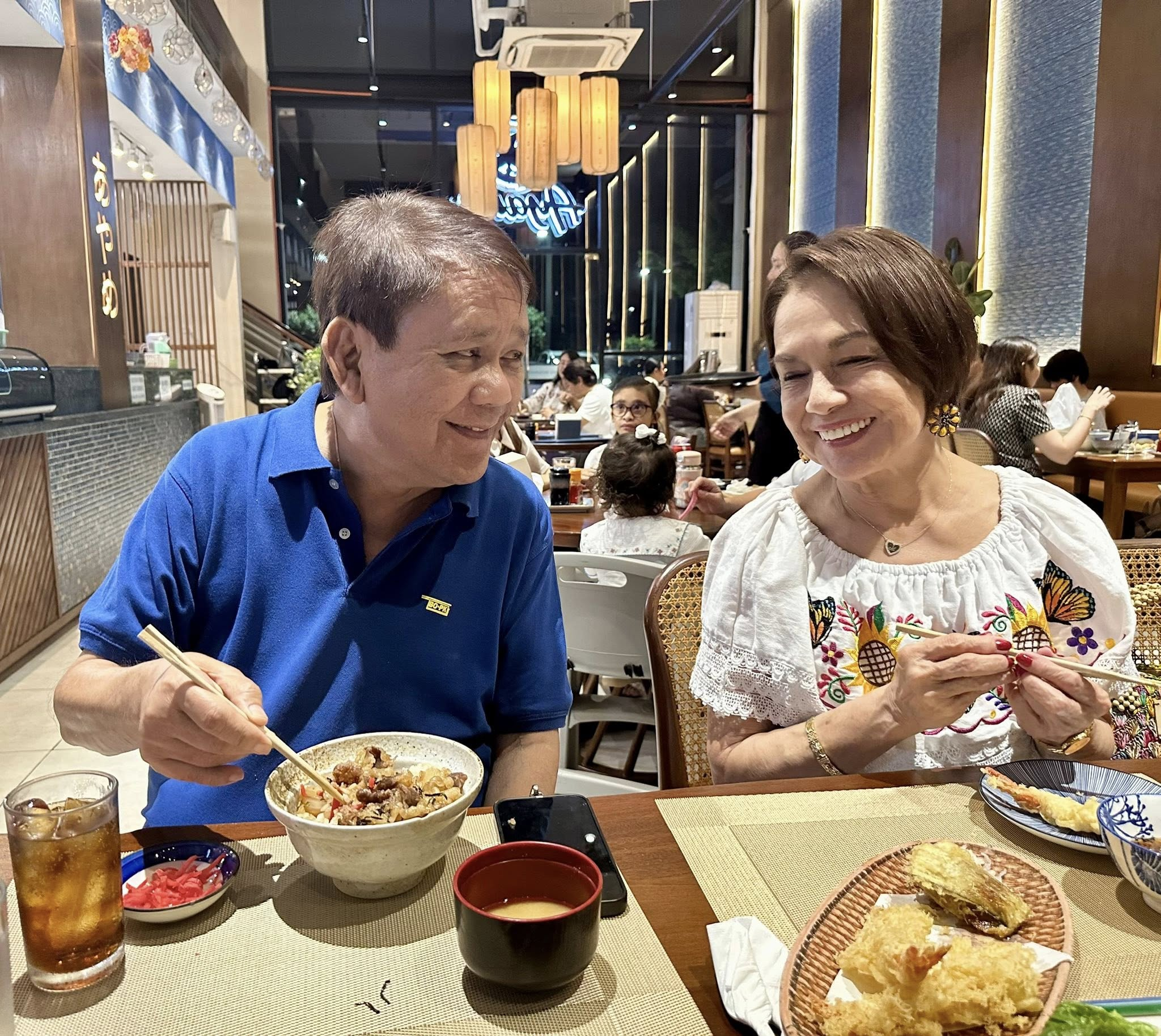
Osmeña with his wife Margot.

Osmeña is married to Margarita "Margot" Lim Vargas who they have one child, Ramon Miguel V. Osmeña. He started dating Margot in 1969 but had to leave the Philippines for the United States in 1972 together with his parents when martial law was declared by Philippine President and dictator Ferdinand Marcos. They eventually got married in 1983.

Osmeña has one grandchild, Ana Margarita Victoria "Anita" Osmeña, the daughter of Ramon Miguel and his wife Ana Gabriela Beatriz "Bea" Villegas.

On November 6, 2011, Osmeña's mother Lourdes de la Rama-Osmeña died at the age of 98 in Bacolod City. One of his longtime political allies and close friends, the late Cebu 1st District Rep. Raul V. del Mar, was also his second cousin through their shared great-grandfather Nicasio Chiong Veloso.

== Ancestry ==
Ancestors of Tomas Osmeña

8. Antonio Sanson
4. Sergio Osmeña
18. Severino Osmeña
9. Juana Osmeña
19. Paula Suico
2. Sergio Osmeña Jr.
10. Nicasio Chiong Veloso
5. Estefania Chiong Veloso
11. Genoveva Visitacion Rosales
1. Tomas Osmeña
24. Felix Mariano de la Rama
12. Isidro Madrid de la Rama
25. Fermina Agustina Ana Emilia Rodríguez
6. Esteban de la Rama
26. Luis Estanislao Militante
13. Ambrocia Aniceta Melliza Militante
27. Maria Melliza
3. Lourdes de la Rama
7. Natividad Aguilar

Political offices
Preceded by Antonio Veloso	24th Mayor of Cebu City; 1988-1995	Succeeded by Alvin Garcia
Preceded by Alvin Garcia	24th Mayor of Cebu City; 2001-2010	Succeeded by Michael Rama
Preceded by Michael Rama	24th Mayor of Cebu City; 2016-2019	Succeeded by Edgardo Labella
Preceded by Dondon Hontiveros	21st Vice Mayor of Cebu City; 2025–present	Incumbent
Party political offices
New political party	Leader of Bando Osmeña – Pundok Kauswagan; 1987–present	Incumbent
House of Representatives of the Philippines
Preceded by Antonio Cuenco	Member of the House of Representatives from the 2nd District of Cebu City; 2010–2013	Succeeded by Rodrigo Abellanosa
