= Nigel Paul Villarete =

Filipino civil engineer (born 1962)

Nigel Paul C. Villarete
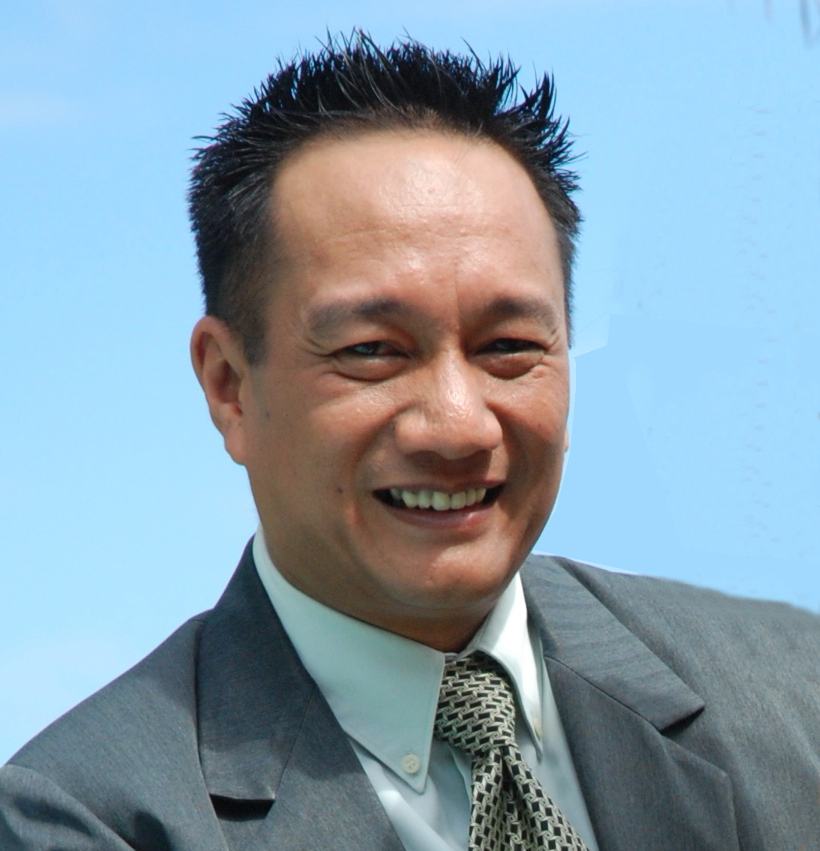

General Manager of the Mactan Cebu International Airport Authority
- In office October 26, 2010 – December 31, 2016
- Preceded by: B. Gen. Danilo Francia (Ret.)

City Planning and Development Coordinator of Cebu City
- In office July 1, 2003 – October 25, 2010
- Succeeded by: Ma. Concepcion T. Encabo

Personal details
- Born: Nigel Paul Villarete; September 18, 1962 (age 64) Cebu City, Cebu, Philippines
- Party: Liberal; BOPK (local party)
- Spouse: Emma Cañazares Villarete
- Children: Samuel Ken C. Villarete
- Education: Asian Institute of Technology; Cebu Institute of Technology; University of the Philippines - School of Urban and Regional Planning (SURP)
- Profession: Civil Engineer, Urban Planner, Transport Economist

Nigel Paul C. Villarete (born September 18, 1962) is a Filipino civil engineer and urban planner. He was the general manager of Mactan–Cebu International Airport and the chief executive officer of the Mactan–Cebu International Airport Authority (MCIAA) from October 26, 2010 to December 31, 2016.

Prior to his appointment to MCIA, Villarete served as the city administrator of Cebu City in 2001 to 2003, and its City Planning and Development Coordinator from 2003 to 2010.

== Professional background ==
Villarete started his engineering career as a member of the faculty of the Civil Engineering Department of the Cebu Institute of Technology in 1983. In 1986, he was appointed as the head of the Civil Engineering Department, College of Engineering and Architecture, of the University of the Visayas (UV) in Cebu City, Philippines.

In 1989, he was appointed as monitoring and evaluation engineer of the Province of Cebu, and later was appointed as chief of infrastructure of NEDA Reg. 7, a post he held until 1994. In 1995, Villarete then became the manager for Planning, Studies, and Development (PSAD) Division, of SCHEMA Konsult, Inc. (SKI) – Cebu Office. In 1999, he was also appointed as senior lecturer II at the University of the Philippines Visayas – Cebu College (UPVCC), Management Division, and taught Urban Planning subjects until 2010.

In 2001, then Mayor Tomas Osmeña appointed Villarete as city administrator of Cebu City. After two years, Osmeña appointed Villarete as city planning and development coordinator, a position he held until October 25, 2010, when he was appointed as general manager of Mactan–Cebu International Airport, CEO of MCIAA. While Villarete was nominated by President Benigno Aquino III on May 10, 2010, he was not selected by the MCIAA Board until October 20, 2010, and on October 26, 2010, he assumed office as the chief executive officer of the Mactan–Cebu International Airport Authority (MCIAA) replacing Brigadier General Danilo Francia (Ret.).

As of 2019, Villarete was again serving as Cebu City administrator during which time he served on the mayoral transition team.
