= Cebu City's 1st congressional district =

Legislative district of the Philippines

- Constituency for the House of Representatives of the Philippines
- Boundary of Cebu City's 1st congressional district in Cebu City

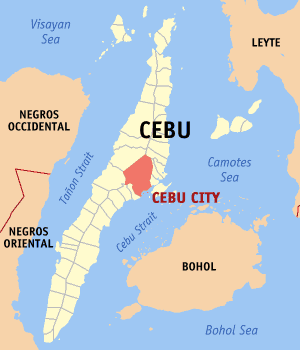
- Location of Cebu City within Cebu
- City: Cebu
- Region: Central Visayas
- Population: 396,099 (2015)
- Electorate: 325,577 (2019)
- Major settlements: 46 barangays: Barangays; Adlaon; Agsungot; Apas; Bacayan; Banilad; Binaliw; Budlaan; Busay; Cambinocot; Capitol Site; Carreta; Cogon Ramos; Day‑as; Ermita; Guba; Hipodromo; Kalubihan; Kamagayan; Kamputhaw (Camputhaw); Kasambagan; Lahug; Lorega‑San Miguel; Lusaran; Luz; Mabini; Mabolo; Malubog; Pahina Central; Pari-an; Paril; Pit-os; Pulangbato; Sambag I; Sambag II; San Antonio; San Jose; San Roque; Santa Cruz; Santo Niño (Central); Sirao; T. Padilla (Villa Gonzalo); Talamban; Taptap; Tejero; Tinago; Zapatera

Current constituency
- Created: 1987
- Representative: Rachel del Mar
- Political party: NUP
- Congressional bloc: Majority

Cebu City's 1st congressional district is one of the two congressional districts of the Philippines in the city of Cebu. It has been represented in the House of Representatives of the Philippines since 1987. The district consists of forty six barangays of the city locally referred to as the "North District". It was represented in the 20th Congress by Rachel del Mar of the National Unity Party (NUP).

== Representation history ==
Since the creation of the seat in 1987, it has always been held by members of the Del Mar family.

No.	Image	Member	Term	Congress	Party	Electoral history	Constituent LGUs
Cebu City's 1st District for House of Representatives of the Philippines
District created February 2, 1987.
1		Raul V. del Mar	June 30, 1987 — June 30, 1998	8th	LABAN; Local: Panaghiusa	Elected in 1987.	1987–present Adlaon, Agsungot, Apas, Bacayan, Banilad, Binaliw, Budlaan, Busay, Cambinocot, Capitol Site, Carreta, Cogon Ramos, Day‑as, Ermita, Guba, Hipodromo, Kalubihan, Kamagayan, Kamputhaw (Camputhaw), Kasambagan, Lahug, Lorega‑San Miguel, Lusaran, Luz, Mabini, Mabolo, Malubog, Pahina Central, Pari-an, Paril, Pit-os, Pulangbato, Sambag I, Sambag II, San Antonio, San Jose, San Roque, Santa Cruz, Santo Niño (Central), Sirao, T. Padilla (Villa Gonzalo), Talamban, Taptap, Tejero, Tinago, Zapatera
1		Raul V. del Mar	June 30, 1987 — June 30, 1998	9th	LDP; Local: BOPK or Panaghiusa	Re-elected in 1992.	
1		Raul V. del Mar	June 30, 1987 — June 30, 1998	10th	Lakas; Local: BOPK	Re-elected in 1995.	
2		Raoul B. del Mar	June 30, 1998 — June 30, 2001	11th	PROMDI; Local: BOPK	Elected in 1998.	
(1)		Raul V. del Mar	June 30, 2001 — June 30, 2010	12th	Lakas; Local: BOPK	Elected in 2001.	
(1)		Raul V. del Mar	June 30, 2001 — June 30, 2010	13th	Lakas; Local: BOPK	Re-elected in 2004.	
(1)		Raul V. del Mar	June 30, 2001 — June 30, 2010	14th	Lakas; Local: BOPK	Re-elected in 2007.	
3		Rachel Marguerite B. del Mar	June 30, 2010 — June 30, 2013	15th	Liberal; Local: BOPK	Elected in 2010.	
(1)		Raul V. del Mar	June 30, 2013 — November 16, 2020	16th	Liberal; Local: BOPK	Elected in 2013.	
(1)		Raul V. del Mar	June 30, 2013 — November 16, 2020	17th	Liberal; Local: BOPK	Re-elected in 2016.	
(1)		Raul V. del Mar	June 30, 2013 — November 16, 2020	18th	Liberal; Local: BOPK	Re-elected in 2019. Died in office.	
—	Vacant		November 16, 2020 — June 30, 2022	18th	No special election held to fill vacancy.		
(3)		Rachel Marguerite B. del Mar	June 30, 2022 — Incumbent	19th	NPC; Local: BOPK	Elected in 2022	
(3)		Rachel Marguerite B. del Mar	June 30, 2022 — Incumbent	20th	NUP; Local: KUSUG	Re-elected in 2025	

== Election results ==
=== 2025 ===
Incumbent Rachel del Mar (Nationalist People's Coalition) ran for a second term. She was previously elected in 2022 with 45.99% of the vote and a 50,350 vote (20.65%) margin over her closest opponent.

Del Mar ran against three other candidates, including Cebu City councilor Mary Ann de los Santos (Liberal Party-BOPK) and Cebu City Liga ng mga Barangay president Franklyn Ong (Laban ng Demokratikong Pilipino). Both Del Mar and Ong ran under BOPK in the previous election, with Del Mar defecting from her late father Raul's longtime party in favor of incumbent mayor Raymond Garcia's Kugi Uswag Sugbo.

Del Mar won re-election, albeit with a decreased margin of 23,876 votes (9.56%), over second-placer Ong.

2025 Philippine House of Representatives election in the 1st District of Cebu City
Party	Candidate	Votes	%
NPC	Rachel del Mar	105,581	42.26
LDP	Franklyn Ong	81,705	32.70
Liberal	Mary Ann de los Santos	60,282	24.12
Independent	Bert Lerios	2,257	0.90
Total votes		249,825	100%
Margin of victory		23,876	9.56

=== 2022 ===
2022 Philippine House of Representatives election in the 1st District of Cebu City
Party	Candidate	Votes	%
NPC	Rachel del Mar	117,512	45.99%
PDP–Laban	Prisca Niña Mabatid	64,447	25.22%
NUP	Richard Edison Yap	52,982	20.73%
Lakas	Avenescio Piramide	18,627	7.29%
Independent	Manuel Momongan	1,929	0.75%
Total votes		243,785	100%
Margin of victory		50,350	20.65%

=== 2019 ===
2019 Philippine House of Representatives election in the 1st District of Cebu City
Party	Candidate	Votes	%
Liberal	Raul del Mar (incumbent)	135,528	61.34
PDP–Laban	Richard Edison Yap	81,575	36.92
Independent	Florencio Villarin	2,244	1.02
Independent	Ricardo Dungog	1,609	0.73
Total votes		220,956	100.00
Margin of victory		53,953	24.42
Liberal hold			

=== 2016 ===
2016 Philippine House of Representatives election in the 1st District of Cebu City
Party	Candidate	Votes	%
Liberal	Raul del Mar (incumbent)	134,940	66.26
UNA	Alvin Garcia	64,348	31.60
Independent	Ricardo Adlawan	2,400	1.18
Independent	Juan Arenasa	1,952	0.96
Total votes		203,640	100.00
Margin of victory		70,592	34.66
Liberal hold			

=== 2013 ===
2013 Philippine House of Representatives election in the 1st District of Cebu City
Party	Candidate	Votes	%
Liberal	Raul del Mar	133,149	74.55
UNA	Annabelle Rama	35,716	20.00
Independent	Marlo Maamo	7,092	3.97
Independent	Florencio Villarin	1,558	0.87
Independent	Don Navarro	442	0.25
Independent	Junex Doronio	353	0.20
Independent	Vic Mañalac	287	0.16
Total votes		178,597	100.00
Margin of victory		97,433	54.55
Liberal hold			

=== 2010 ===
2010 Philippine House of Representatives election in the 1st District of Cebu City
Party	Candidate	Votes	%
Liberal	Rachel del Mar	98,501	58.49
Nacionalista	Mary Ann De Los Santos	58,492	34.73
PGRP	Jacinto Del Mar	5,555	3.30
Independent	Isabelo Osmeña, Sr.	2,405	1.43
Independent	Francisco Ashley Acedillo	2,052	1.22
Independent	Florencio Villarin	1,082	0.64
Independent	Juan Arenasa	179	0.11
Independent	Miguel Selim	151	0.09
Total votes		168,417	100.00
Margin of victory		40,009	23.76

=== 2007 ===
2007 Philippine House of Representatives election in the 1st District of Cebu City
Party	Candidate	Votes	%
Lakas	Raul del Mar (incumbent)	122,988	94.05
GO	Florencio Villarin	7,153	5.47
Independent	Juan Arenasa	627	0.48
Total votes		130,768	100.00
Lakas hold			

== See also ==
- Legislative districts of Cebu City
