= Legislative districts of Cebu City =

Legislative district of the Philippines

The legislative districts of Cebu City are the representations of the highly urbanized city of Cebu in the various national legislatures of the Philippines. The city is currently represented in the lower house of the Congress of the Philippines through its first and second congressional districts.

== History ==
What is now Cebu City initially formed part of the at-large district of Cebu from 1898 to 1899. It later formed part of second district of Cebu for the Philippine Assembly in 1907. When seats for the upper house of the Philippine Legislature were elected from territory-based districts between 1916 and 1935, the then-municipality of Cebu formed part of the tenth senatorial district which elected two out of the 24-member senate. When the municipality of Cebu was converted into a chartered city in 1936, the city remained within the second district of Cebu province.

In the disruption caused by the Second World War, two delegates represented the chartered city (separately from the province) in the National Assembly of the Japanese-sponsored Second Philippine Republic: one was the city mayor (an ex officio member), while the other was elected through an assembly of KALIBAPI members within the city during the Japanese occupation of the Philippines. Upon the restoration of the Philippine Commonwealth in 1945, the city's representation reverted to the second district of Cebu province, of which it remained a part until 1972.

Cebu City was represented in the Interim Batasang Pambansa as part of Region VII from 1978 to 1984. After becoming a highly urbanized city in 1979 by virtue of Batas Pambansa Blg. 51, Cebu City elected two representatives, at large, to the Regular Batasang Pambansa in the 1984 elections.

Cebu City was reapportioned into two congressional districts under the new Constitution which was proclaimed on February 11, 1987. The two districts elected members to the restored House of Representatives starting that same year.

== Current districts ==
Legislative districts and representatives of Cebu City
District	Current Representative	Party		Constituent LGUs	Area	Population	Map
District	Current Representative	Local	National	Constituent LGUs	Area	Population	Map
1st (Cebu City North)	Rachel del Mar (since 2022); Lahug	KUSUG	NUP	List: Adlaon, Agsungot, Apas, Bacayan, Banilad, Binaliw, Budlaan, Busay, Cambinocot, Capitol Site, Carreta, Cogon Ramos, Day‑as, Ermita, Guba, Hipodromo, Kalubihan, Kamagayan, Kamputhaw (Camputhaw), Kasambagan, Lahug, Lorega‑San Miguel, Lusaran, Luz, Mabini, Mabolo, Malubog, Pahina Central, Parian, Paril, Pit-os, Pulangbato, Sambag I, Sambag II, San Antonio, San Jose, San Roque, Santa Cruz, Santo Niño (Central), Sirao, T. Padilla (Villa Gonzalo), Talamban, Taptap, Tejero, Tinago, Zapatera	46 Barangays	396,099 (2015)	
2nd (Cebu City South)	Eduardo Rama Jr. (since 2022); Basak San Nicolas	BARUG	Lakas	List: Babag, Basak Pardo, Basak San Nicolas, Bonbon, Buhisan, Bulacao, Buot, Calamba, Cogon Pardo, Duljo Fatima, Guadalupe, Inayawan, Kalunasan, Kinasang-an Pardo, Labangon, Mambaling, Pahina San Nicolas, Pamutan, Pasil, Poblacion Pardo, Pung-ol Sibugay, Punta Princesa, Quiot, San Nicolas Proper, Sapangdaku, Sawang Calero, Sinsin, Suba, Sudlon I, Sudlon II, Tabunan, Tagbao, Tisa, Toong	34 Barangays	526,512 (2015)	

== At-large district (defunct) ==
=== 1943–1944 ===
Period	Representative
National Assembly; 1943–1944	Paulino A. Gullas
National Assembly; 1943–1944	Juan C. Zamora (ex officio)

=== 1984–1986 ===
Period	Representative
Regular Batasang Pambansa; 1984–1986	Antonio V. Cuenco
Regular Batasang Pambansa; 1984–1986	Marcelo B. Fernan

== See also ==
- Legislative districts of Cebu
