= Carabao mango =

Mango cultivar

Mangifera 'Carabao'
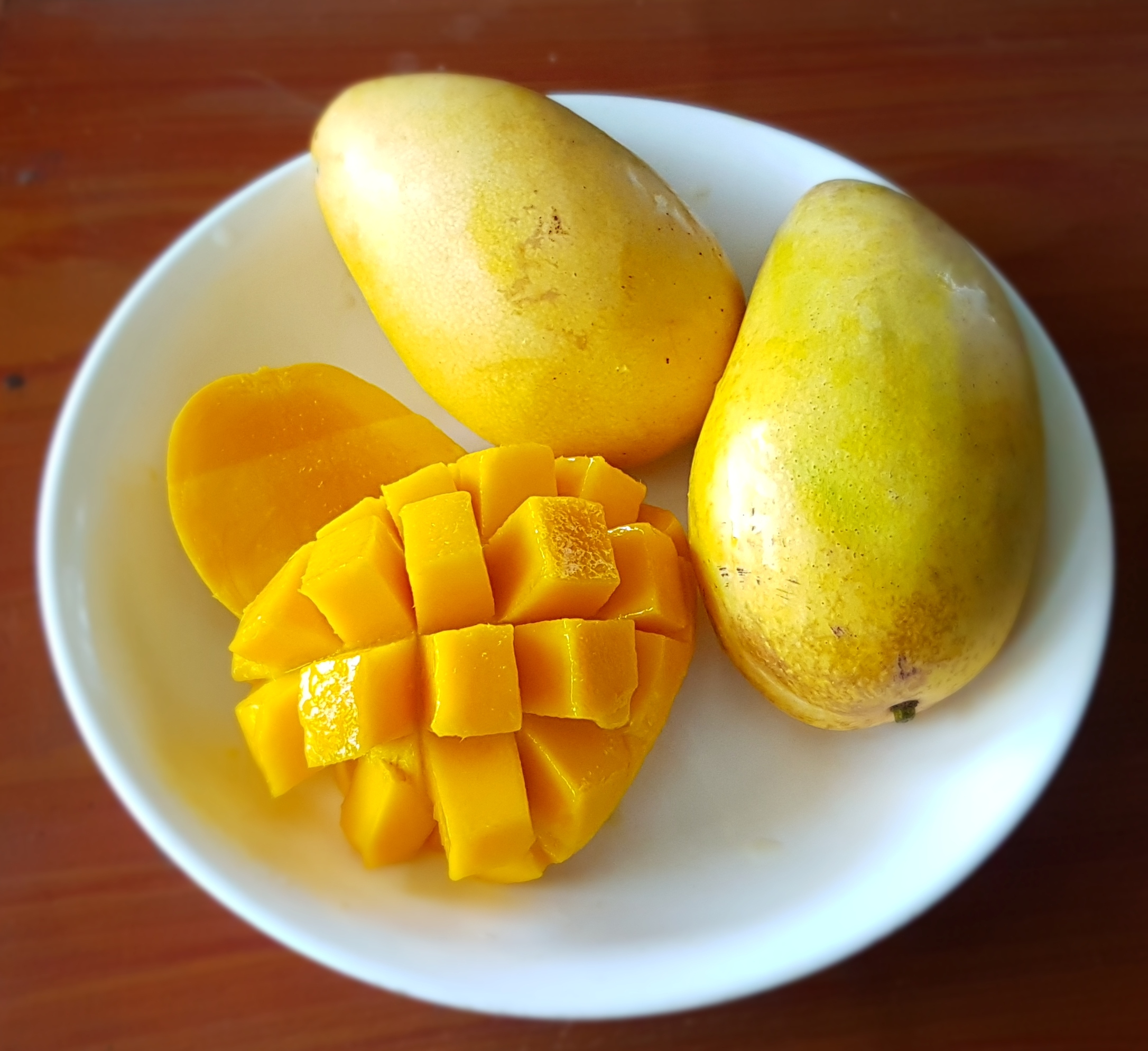
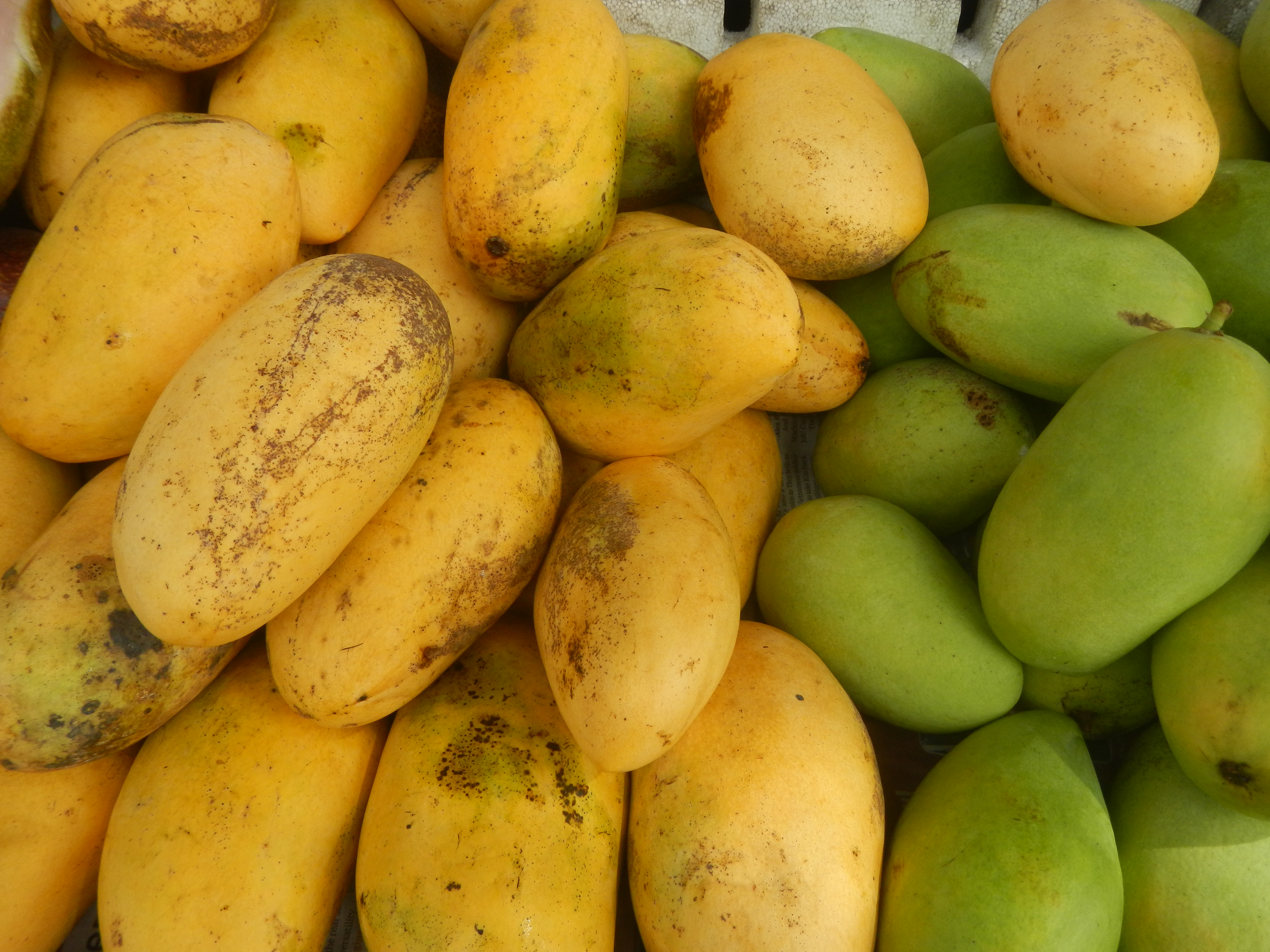
- Top: Ripe 'Carabao' mangoes from Bukidnon; Bottom: Ripe and unripe 'Carabao' mangoes from Bulacan
- Genus: Mangifera
- Cultivar: 'Carabao'
- Marketing names: Carabao mango, Philippine mango, Champagne mango, Manila mango, Manila super mango, Honey mango, Manggang kalabaw
- Origin: Philippines

The Carabao mango, also known as the Philippine mango or Manila mango among other names, is a variety of particularly sweet mango from the Philippines. One of the most important varieties cultivated in the Philippines, the carabao mango is known internationally for its sweetness and exotic taste. It is named after the carabao, a native Filipino breed of domesticated water buffalo considered the unofficial national animal.

== Description ==
Carabao mangoes are around 12.5 cm (5 in) in length and 8.5 cm (3 1/4 in) in diameter. These fruits are kidney-shaped and range from short to elongated. When ripe, the fruit is bright yellow and aromatic, and its flesh a rich yellow with a sweet, tender and melting consistency. Like other Southeast Asian-type mangoes, it is polyembryonic (in contrast to Indian-type mangoes). Unripe or underripe carabao mangoes are very sour, and thus are traditionally eaten with condiments like shrimp paste, salt, vinegar, or soy sauce, or pickled into burong mangga. Fruiting season is usually from late May to early July.

== Strains ==
There are 14 different strains of Carabao mango approved by the National Seed Industry Council of the Bureau of Plant Industry. These strains are Guimaras Super (Galila), Talaban, Fresco, Sweet Elena, Elfondo, Lamao #1, Tanaleon, JTA Mango Sweet, MMSU Gold, P1 King Rodolfo, GES 73, GES 77, GES 84, and GES 85. A comparative study conducted by Bureau of Agricultural Research of the Department of Agriculture in 2003 found that the Sweet Elena of Zambales is the sweetest Carabao mango strain.

The Mexican Ataulfo and Manilita mango cultivars descended from the Philippine mango through the Manila galleon trade between 1600 and 1800. Both of these cultivars are sometimes referred to as "Manila mangoes" in trade. During the American colonial period of the Philippines, the Carabao mango was also known as the champagne mango, a name which is now also applied in North American markets to the similar descendant cultivar, Ataulfo. Another common market name for the cultivar is honey mango, which is also used for Ataulfo.

== Culture ==
Guimaras mangoes are celebrated in the annual Manggahan Festival of the province of Guimaras.

Carabao mangoes are also widely grown in Cebu for the dried mango industry, particularly in the barangays of Guadalupe and Kalunasan of Cebu City. These are also celebrated annually in the Mangga Festival of Kalunasan, Cebu City; as well as the Cebu Mangoes Festival of Mactan Newtown.

== See also ==
- Mangga wani (Mangifera caesia)
- Pahutan mango (Mangifera altissima)
- Pico (mango)
