= Ma-Cho Temple =

Taoist temple in La Union, Philippines

- Location: San Fernando, La Union, Philippines

History
- Built: September 11, 1975

Site notes
- Elevation: 21.34 metres (70.0 ft)

The Ma-Cho, Mazu or Ma Cho Temple (simplified Chinese: 菲律滨隆天宫; traditional Chinese: 菲律濱隆天宮; pinyin: Fēilǜbīn Lóngtiān Gōng; Pe̍h-ōe-jī: Hui-li̍p-pin Liông Thiⁿ-keng) is a Taoist temple to the Chinese Sea-Goddess Mazu located on Quezon Avenue in Barangay II, San Fernando, La Union in the Philippines. It was built in 1977 by a group of Filipino-Chinese devotees under the leadership of Dy Keh Hio and with the support of former Tourism Secretary Jose D. Aspiras.

== History ==
Mazu or Matsu (Chinese: 媽祖; Pe̍h-ōe-jī: Má-chó͘; pinyin: Māzǔ) is the deified form of the medieval Fujian Saintly Lady, Lin Moniang (Chinese: 林默娘; Pe̍h-ōe-jī: Lîm Bia̍k-niû; pinyin: Lín Mòniáng). Mazuism is not formally recognized as an organised religion in Mainland China or Taiwan, but is an important part of Chinese folk religion in Fujian, Taiwan and Oversea Chinese communities worldwide.

The temple was constructed on September 11, 1975. This project was supported by then-Tourism minister Jose Aspiras with the cooperation of the Chinese community.

== Architecture ==
With an elevation of 70 above sea level, the 7-story temple is a towering 11-tiered, multi-hued attraction on a more than a hectare of lot and accessible by separate routes. The temple's attractions include the Majestic Five Door Gate, Bamboo Garden, the Liang Thing Pagoda, 2 circular pools or ponds and the golden emblem of a dragon, the Bell Tower and the Drum Tower. The interiors of Ma-Cho Temple is filled with Chinese ancient decorations or art. Taiwan laborers helped build the building under famous Architect Thomas Diokno. The temple is adorned by Chinese motif of Taipei lions and dragons (camphor woods) and massive stones. Its original spider type dome awes the beholder with the interlinking wood carvings of saints (piling up in a total of 11 tiers). Statues of animals, the famous towering arch, and the meditation room all focus on Mazu's eyes, which are closed while her hands are clasped together at her chest.

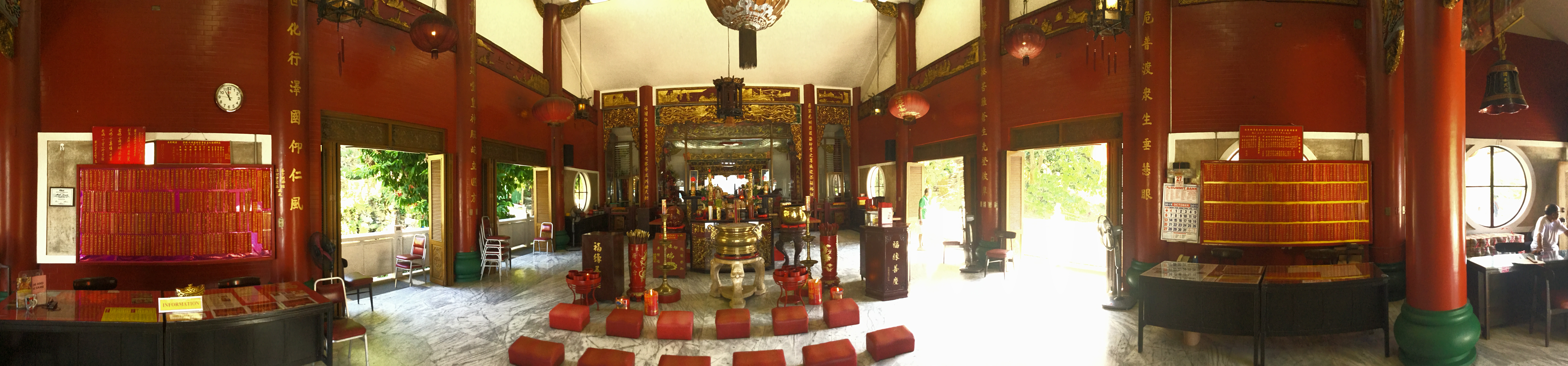
Interior view of the temple

== Services ==
Unlike Cebu's Phu Sian Temple, Ma-Cho Temple is open to the worshipers and non-worshipers alike, particularly Catholics. Mazu's 8-inch icon is at the center of the Temple's main altar. The icon has a Catholic counterpart, Our Lady of Caysasay, in St Martin's Basilica in Taal, Batangas. Yearly, 5th day of the 8th month of the Linar Calendar, from September 21–26, Mazu's image would be processioned to the Basilica of St. Martin in Taal, Batangas and back to San Fernando, La Union, for the fiesta, culminating in a cultural presentation. A ritual among devotees is where one prays to the gods to grant one's wish. Weekly, a “Buyong” session is held as temple priests read Mazu's message to the devotees.

The temple is not exclusively dedicated only to Mazu, Tho Ti Kong (Chinese: 土地公; Pe̍h-ōe-jī: Thó͘-tī-kong; pinyin: Tǔdìgōng), an Earth Deity, is also venerated in the temple. A statue of Kuan Yim Ma (Chinese: 觀音媽; Pe̍h-ōe-jī: Koan-im-má; pinyin: Guānyīn mā) or Kuan Se Im (Chinese: 觀世音; Pe̍h-ōe-jī: Koan-sè-im; pinyin: Guānshìyīn), a Buddhist Goddess of Mercy, stands in the garden. In the exterior of the temple, the “Chinese 18 Saints" (carved in stone statues) are worshipped at the entrance wall, facing the temple patio made of "tisa" or bricks in circular form. The courtyard has a pond of water lilies and gold fish.

== Image gallery ==
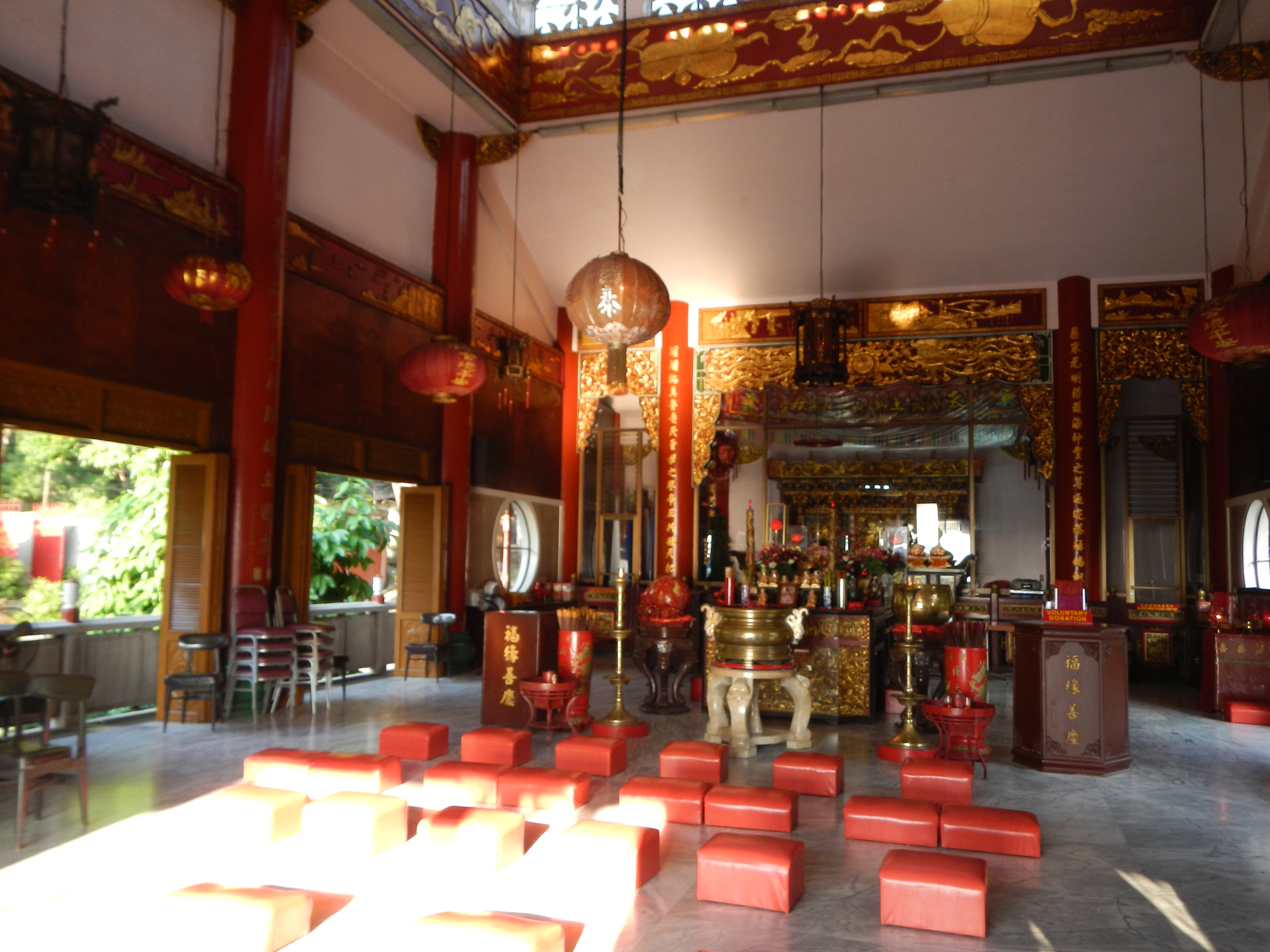
The main worship hall dedicated to Mazu

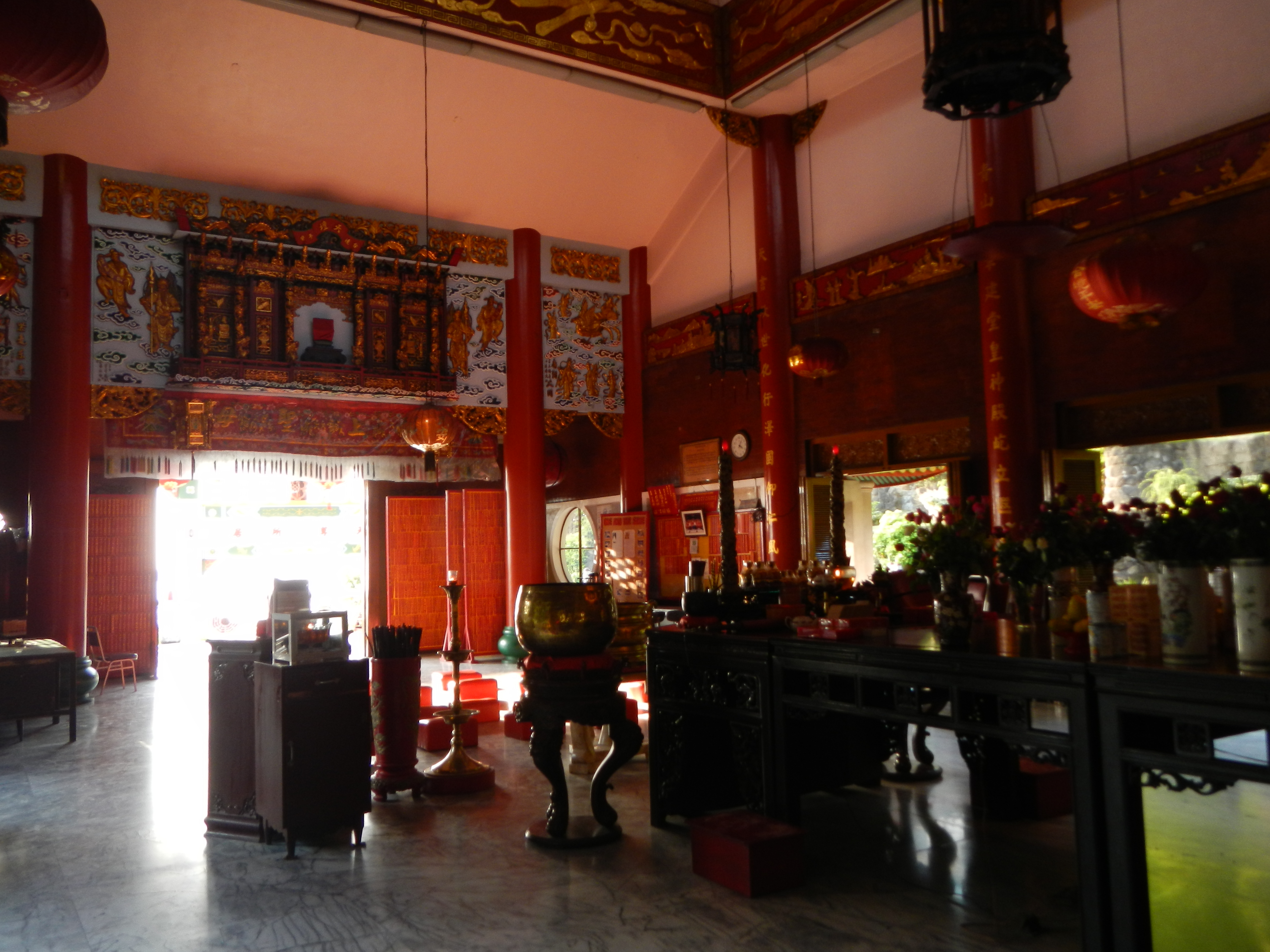
Interior of the temple

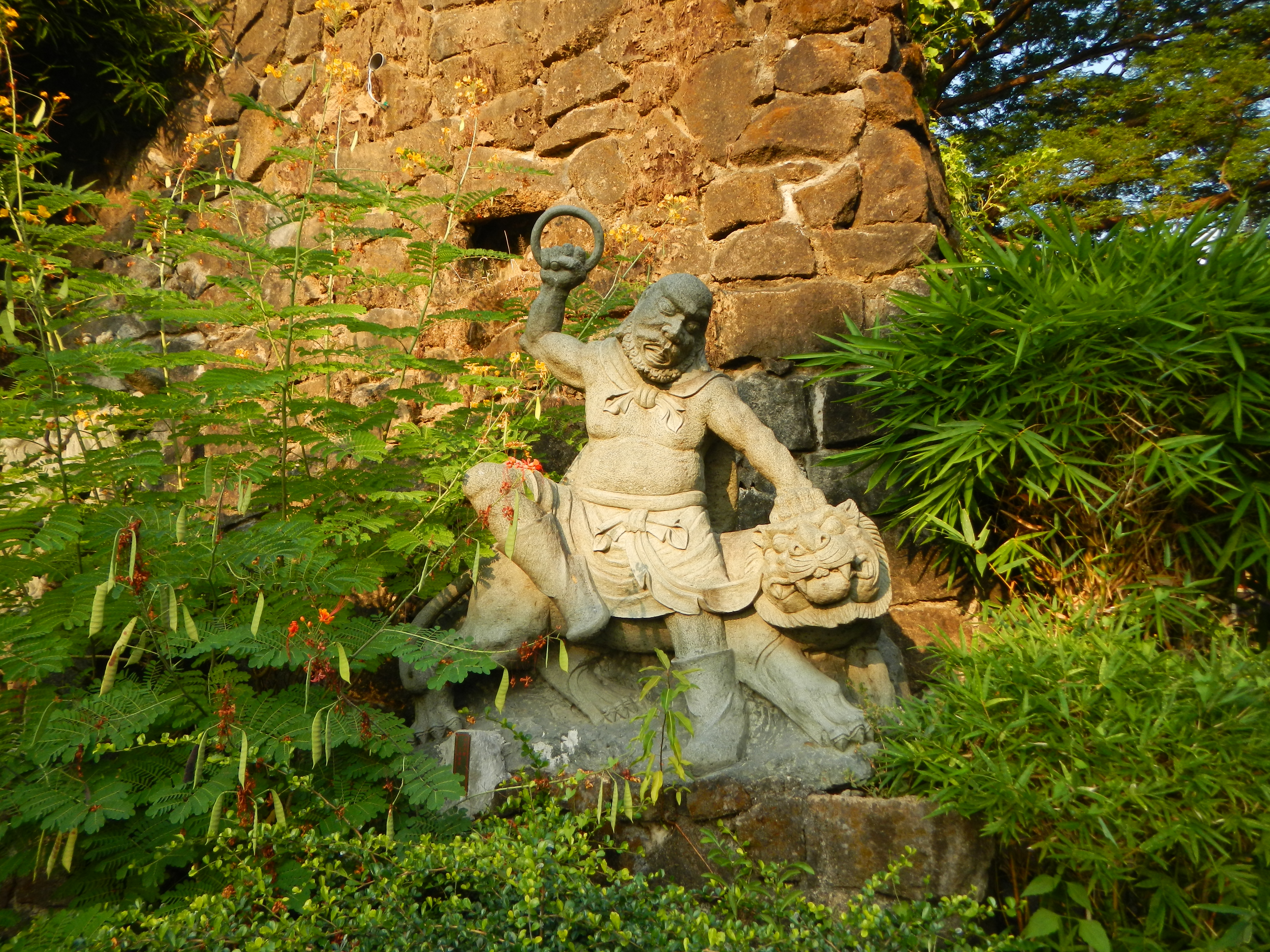
Statue of Taming Tiger Luohan

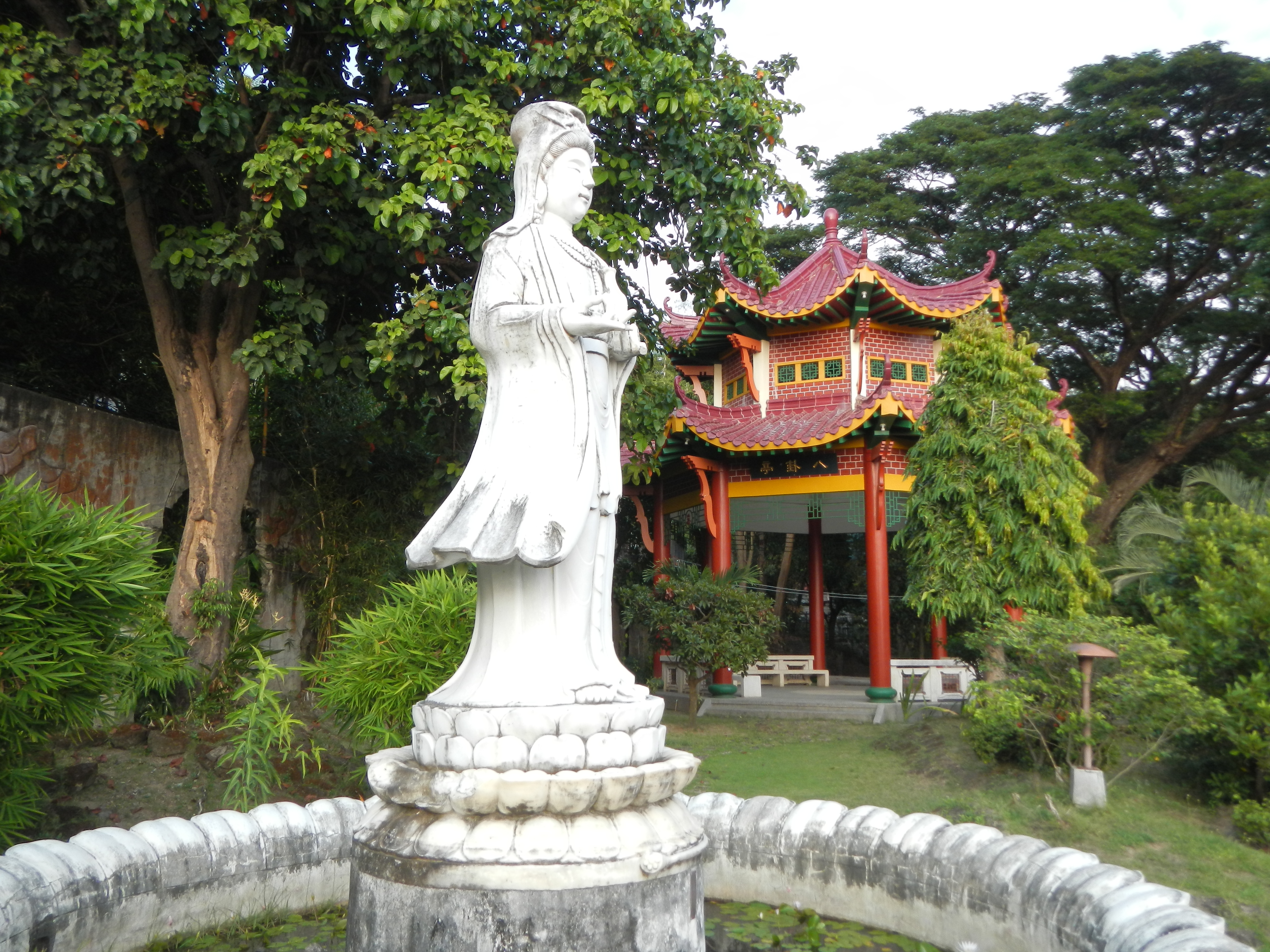
Kuan Yim Ma or Goddess of Mercy in the garden

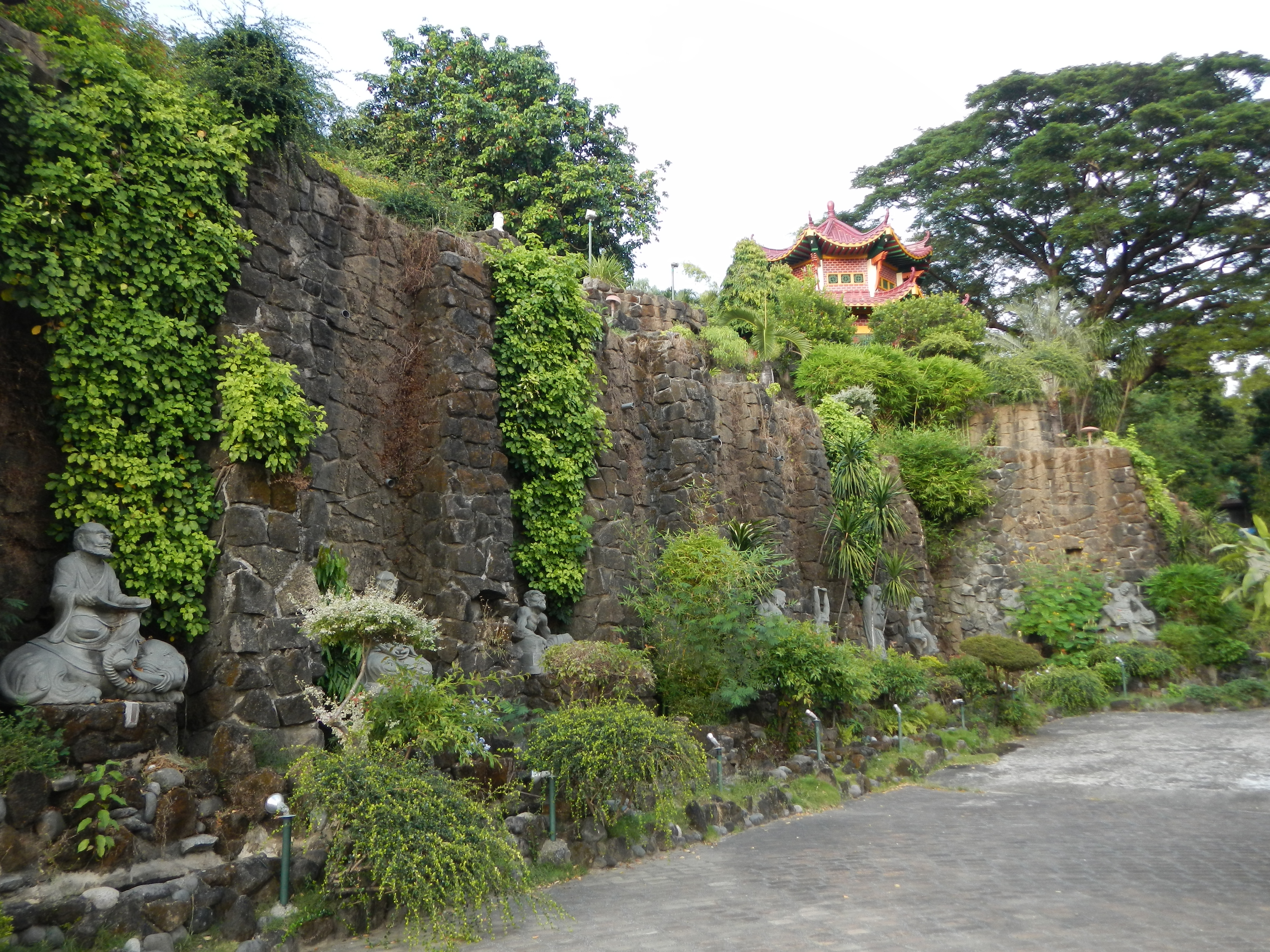
Chinese 18 Luohan

== See also ==
- Chinese folk religion in Southeast Asia
- Cebu Taoist Temple, Beverly Hills, Cebu City
- Seng Guan Temple, Tondo, Manila
- Lon Wa Buddhist Temple, Davao City
- Qianliyan & Shunfeng'er
- List of Mazu temples around the world
