= Pico (mango) =

Variety of fruit

Mangifera 'Pico'
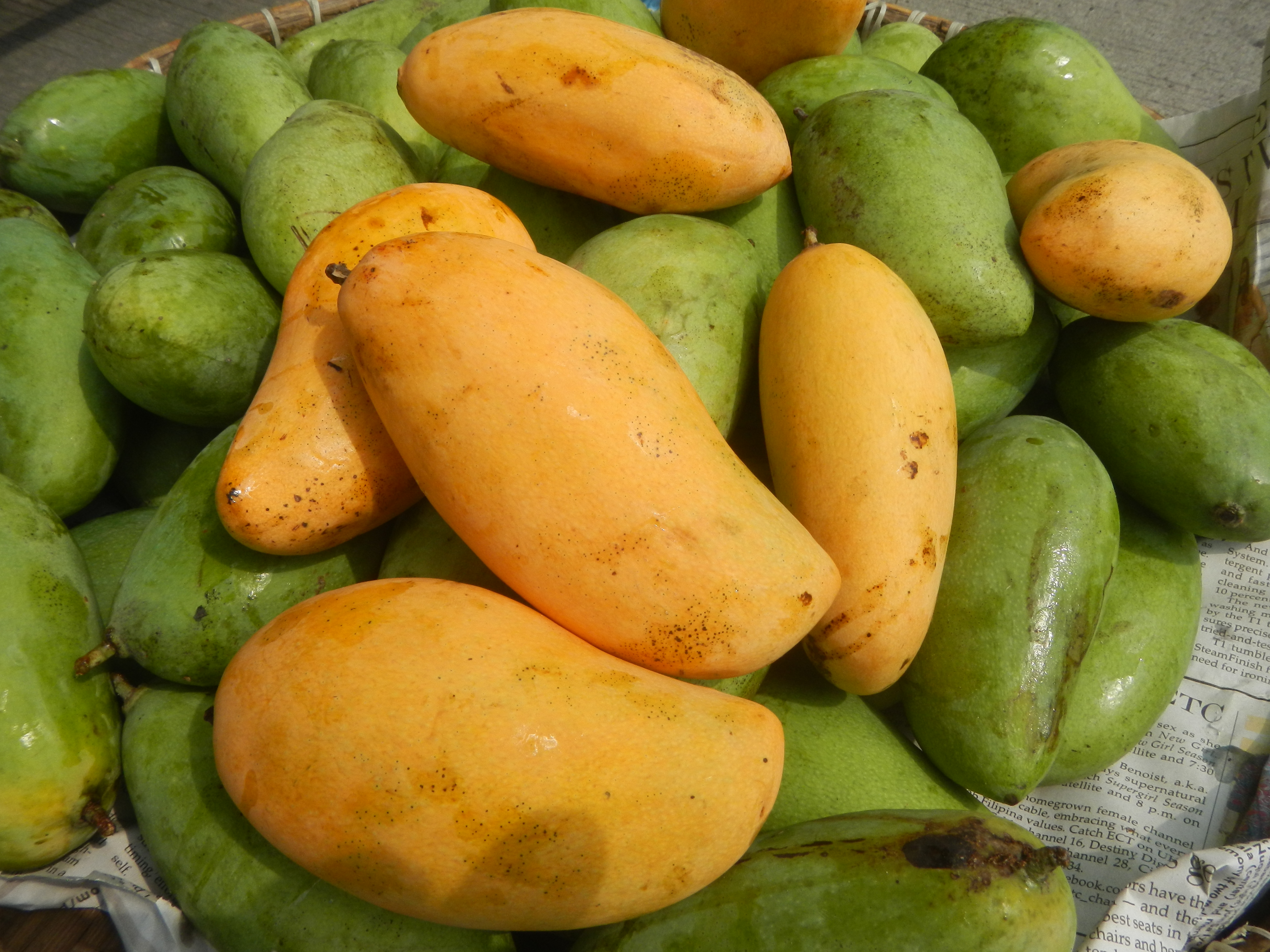
- Ripe and unripe pico mangoes from Bulacan
- Genus: Mangifera
- Cultivar: 'Pico'
- Marketing names: Piko; Padero
- Origin: Philippines

The Pico mango (also spelt piko), also known as padero, is a variety of mango from the Philippines. Along with the Carabao mango, it is among the most commonly commercially cultivated mango cultivar in the Philippines.

Pico mangoes are characterized by highly elongated fruits, reaching up to 12.5 centimetres (4.9 in) in length but only around 8 cm (3.1 in) in diameter. It is distinctly flattened in comparison to the Carabao mango. Ripe fruits are pale yellow to light orange in color. The flesh of ripe fruits is sweet, colored rich orange that usually turn reddish near the tips. The flesh is soft but not as soft as Carabao mangoes.

Like other Southeast Asian-type mangoes, Pico mangoes are polyembryonic, in contrast to Indian-type mangoes. The fruiting season is from May to July.

Pico mangoes are similar in appearance to another native cultivar, the Kabayo or Cabayo mango (lit. "horse mango", not to be confused with the horse mango which is a different species). Kabayo mangoes are also highly elongated in shape. But Kabayo mangoes are rounder in cross-section (not flattened) with a sloped back similar to a Carabao mango, but with the flesh consistency of a Pico mango.

== See also ==
- Carabao mango
- Pahutan mango
- Mangga wani (Mangifera caesia) - also known as Bayuno; another species of mango native to the Philippines.
