= Eddie Woolbright =

American entrepreneur

Edgar Ray Woolbright
- Born: 18 March 1920; Boswell, Oklahoma, United States
- Died: 6 August 1996 (aged 76); Cebu City, Philippines
- Occupation: Businessman
- Known for: Beverly Hills, Cebu City

Edgar Ray Woolbright (18 March 1920 - 6 August 1996) was an American entrepreneur who planned and developed the Beverly Hills subdivision of Lahug, Cebu City in the Philippines.

== Early years (1920–1941) ==
Edgar Ray Woolbright was born in Boswell, Oklahoma on 18 March 1920, son of Ray Wiilbright and Nell Sanders of Oklahoma, United States. His father was a blacksmith. During the Great Depression he worked as a soda jerk, then in the Civilian Conservation Corps. He joined the United States Merchant Marine, and was in Caracas, Venezuela at the time of the December 1941 attack on Pearl Harbor.

== World War II (1941–1945) ==
During World War II (1939–1945) Woolbright continued in the Merchant Marine as a second mate. He sailed in a convoy to Russia in 1942 during the Battle of the Atlantic, in which many of the ships were sunk by German aircraft. That winter the convoy was frozen in Archangel until being freed by a Russian icebreaker. After returning from Archangel he went to Australia to collect supplies to be delivered to Russia via Basra, Iraq. He served in the allied invasion of Sicily and in Naples. His ship was badly damaged in an Atlantic storm and he stayed in the Azores for several months while it was repaired. In October 1944 Woolbright sailed on a supply ship from New Guinea to join the American fleet in the invasion of Leyte. He participated in the Battle of Leyte with the forces of General Douglas MacArthur. He served with the US Coast Guard in Leyte.

== Leyte (1945–1949) ==
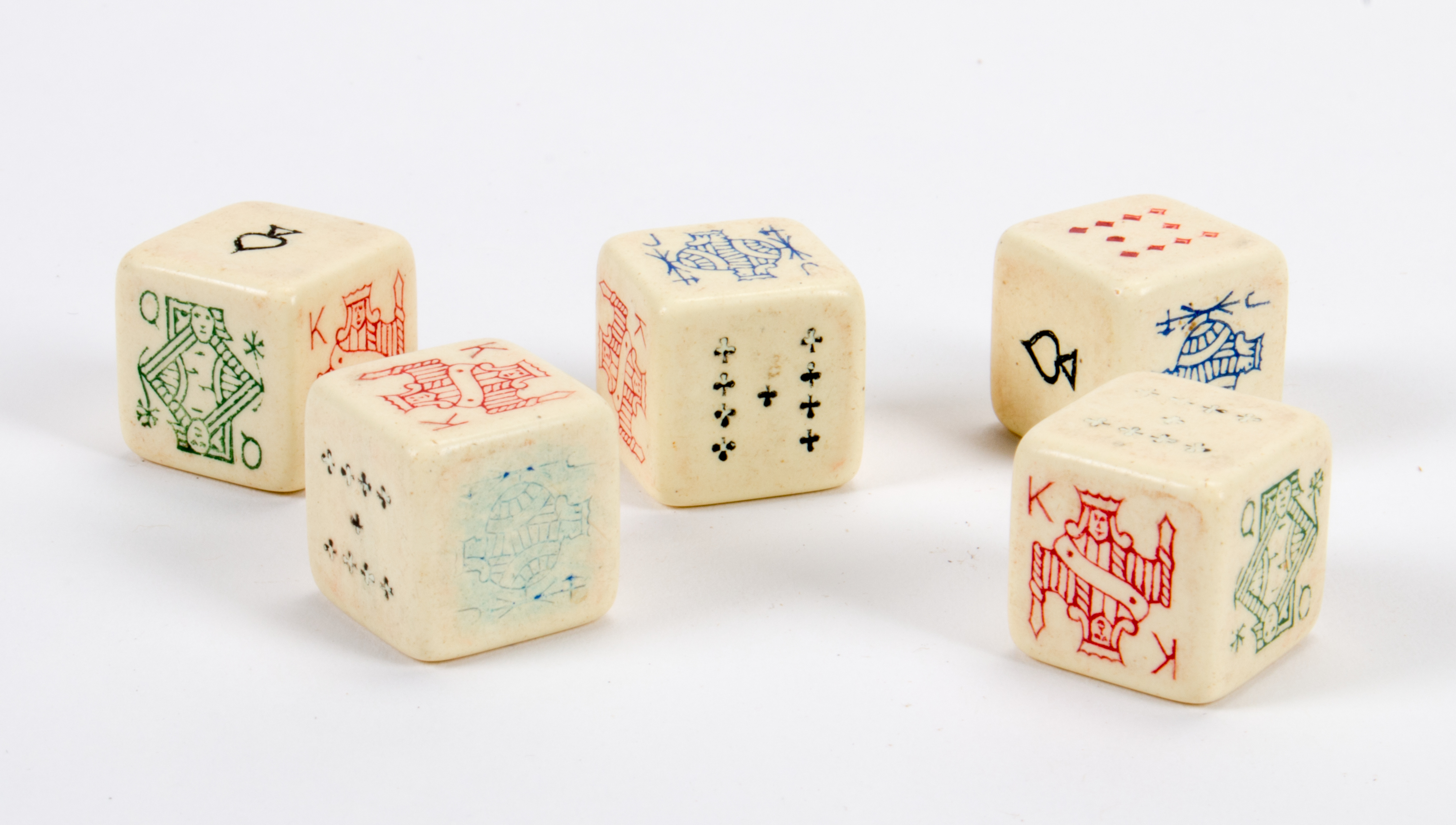
A set of poker dice from the 1940s, of the type used for balut

After the war Woolbright returned to the United States, but soon returned to Leyte Gulf on a ship where he pretended to be sick and was discharged in Tacloban. As the son of a blacksmith and machinist, he saw huge potential in all the scrap metal on the island, left by the armed forces. He started a scrapyard in Palo, Leyte. At that time Tacloban was lawless, so he was always armed. He had several guards with machine guns at his scrapyard.

In 1947 Woolbright was running a hardware and spare parts store, and founded the Airline Hotel and Coffee Shop beside it. He had his own generators, so was not affected by the erratic electricity supply in Tacloban, and could run ice cream machines. He used skills his father had taught him to build an air conditioner, and his was the first air-conditioned restaurant and hotel in Leyte. He came to know the teenaged Imelda Marcos at his restaurant in Tacloban. Imelda Romualdez, as she was then, would stop in on her way home from school. The balut dice game was invented at the hotel. (Note: The game of Balut was derived from poker dice, which had been invented by a group of GIs who used to meet at Woolbright's airport hotel. Two Danish businessmen staying at the hotel developed a variant that could be played by two people. They went for a walk with Woolbright, discussing what to call the new game. They heard a street vendor calling out "Balut! Balut!", the name of the embryonic duck foetus delicacy that he was selling, and decided that would be the name of the dice game. Another source says the balut dice game was invented at the Log Cabin in the 1970s.)

== Cebu City (1949–1996) ==
Tacloban began to slow down as the surplus army machinery boom came to an end. In 1949 Woolbright moved to Cebu City, where he opened "Eddie's Log Cabin Coffee Shop" and "Eddie's Auto Supply". Eddie's Log Cabin was in downtown Cebu City near the wharf, and became a place were politicians and celebrities came to be seen. In the 1960s and 1970s Cebu City was a small town, and Eddie's Log Cabin was an important venue. It was air-conditioned and served American diner food, including coconut cream pie from a recipe of Eddie's mother and turkey for Thanksgiving. It had a soda fountain and an ice cream parlor. Later Woolbright built the Beverly Hotel, which also served traditional American food.

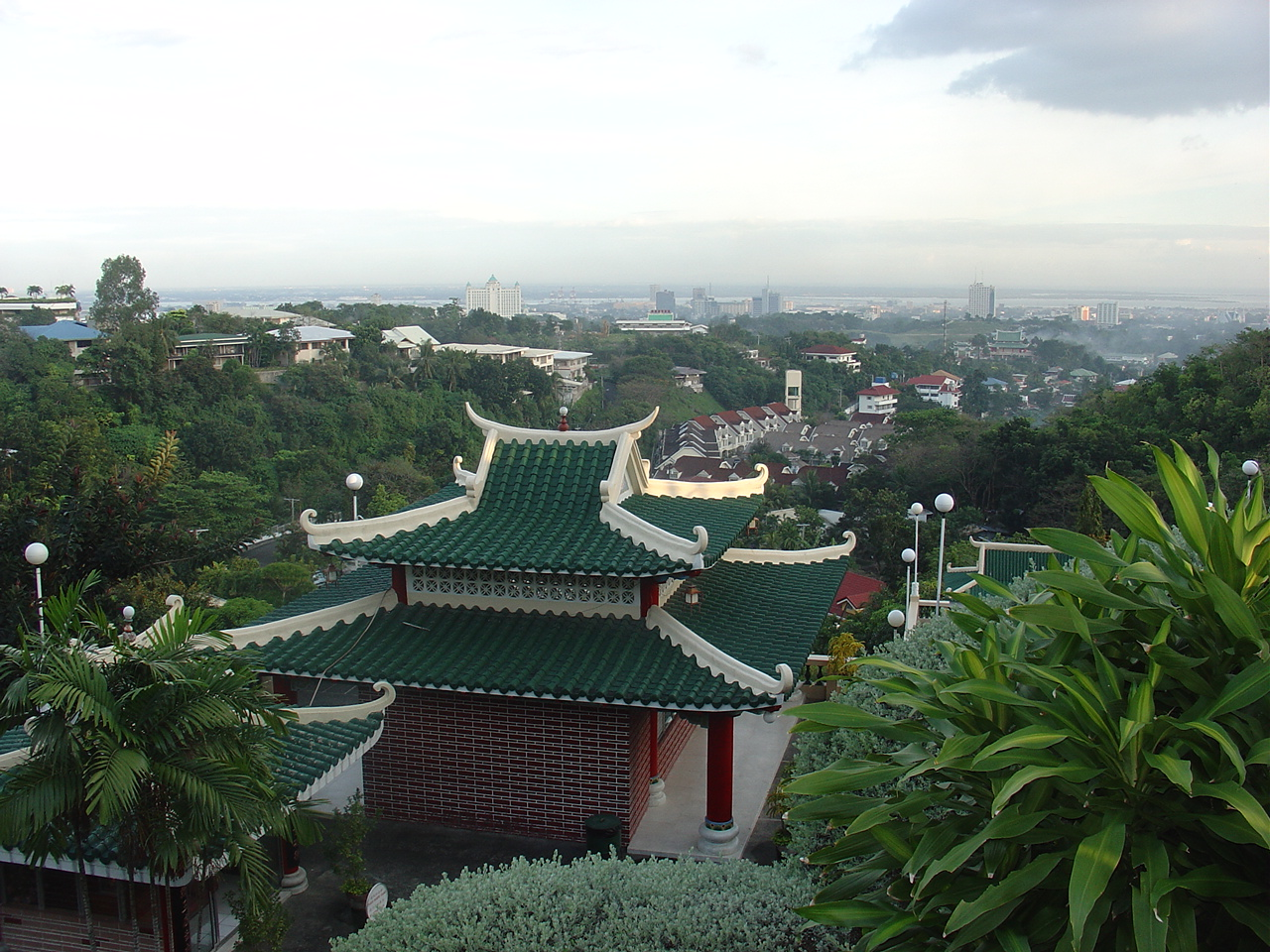
View of Beverly Hills from the Cebu Taoist Temple

Woolbright married Annie Corrales, who was Miss Philippines in 1957. (Note: Mary Ann Carmen Corrales was crowned Miss Philippines at the Jai Alai Skyroom on 23 June 1957, on her third try. Later in 1957 she represented the Philippines in the Miss Universe competition at the Long Beach Convention Center, California. Her sister was the singer Pilita Corrales.) He became involved in land development, construction, water drilling and trading. He saw the potential of the Sudlon Hills in Cebu. The young lawyer Marcelo Fernan, who later became a senator, showed Woolbright a property of more than 33 hectares (82 acres) of undeveloped land owned by the heirs of American expatriate physician Arlington Pond. He bought the land and used army surplus equipment to bulldoze tracts for residential development. His effort to carve lots out of the mountain was seen as crazy at the time.

Beverly Hills, created in the 1960s, was the first large, planned subdivision in Cebu City. It was marketed to affluent residents. The property was in the Salvador Extension of Cebu City and was named after Beverly Hills, California. Woolbright improved the property through grading and filling, and donated these improvements to Cebu City effective 29 May 1969.

President Ferdinand Marcos declared Martial Law on 21 September 1972. In November Woolbright was arrested by the police and detained without charges. In response to a telegram, Imelda Marcos arranged for his release.

On 20 February 1995 the Cebu City Council named Woolbright "An Adopted Son of Cebu". Woolbright died on 6 August 1996. The cause was lung cancer caused by a 5-pack-per-day cigarette habit. He was the father of nine children. In April 2009 a bust of Eddie Woolbright was unveiled in Beverly Hills, Cebu City, at the corner of Woolbright Drive and Third Street, the site of the first "Eddie's Café". As of 2017 his daughter Cebuana Alice Woolbright was running Eddie’s Log Cabin Coffee Shop, still serving dishes like corned beef brisket with cabbage and coconut cream pie.

== Sources ==
- Bacaiso, Jude A. (12 July 2017), "What to eat in Cebu: Corned beef at Eddie's Log Cabin Coffee Shop", Smile
- Bonner (22 December 2011), "Miss Philippines Universe 1957 Mary Ann Carmen Philipps Corrales", Pageant-Mania
- "History of Balut", TeamBalut
- McCallus, Joseph P. (2010), "The King of Leyte and the Junkyard Oakie", The MacArthur Highway and Other Relics of American Empire in the Philippines, Potomac Books, Inc., ISBN 9781597974974
- Oaminal, Clarence Paul (2015-07-08), "Woolbright Drive, Beverly Hills, Cebu City", The Freeman
- Razon, Conchita C. (18 February 2018), "Revisiting the Cebu I missed", Philippine Daily Inquirer
- Taylor, Janine; Borromeo, Katsy; Sanchez, Mikey; Gaw-Yu, Nicolette (2011), "The Gift that Keeps on Giving", Zee.ph
- Ynclino, Flor S. (19 April 2009), "Unveiling of Eddie Woolbright's Bust", philstar Global, The Philippine Star
