= Ataúlfo =

Ataúlfo is one form of the Spanish name equivalent to Adolf (the other being Adolfo). It may refer to:

- Ataulf, 5th-century king of the Visigoths
- Ataulfo Alves (1909–1969), Brazilian samba singer and composer
- Ataúlfo Argenta (1913–1958), Spanish conductor
- Ataulfo (mango), a mango cultivar
