= Battle of Budla-an =

Battle of Budlaan
- Part of the Philippine Revolution
| Date | June 2, 1898 |
| Location | Budla-an, Talamban, Cebu, Captaincy General of the Philippines (now Budla-an, Cebu City, Philippines) |
| Result | Filipino victory |

Belligerents
| Philippines | Spain |

Commanders and leaders
| Gen. Arcadio Maxilom; Gen. Alejo Miñoza; Gen. Lorenzo Eje | Cpt. Garcia |

Strength
| 200 irregulars | 100 men |

Casualties and losses
| 6 dead 10 wounded | 70 dead |

The Battle of Budla-an (Filipino: Labanan sa Budla-an, Cebuano: Sangka sa Budla-an, Spanish: Batalla de Budla-an) was fought on June 2, 1898, between the Philippine Cebuano rebel forces and Spanish and loyalist forces. It took place near Budla-an Falls in Talamban, Cebu, Philippines. Filipino forces won a victory in this battle in which a Spanish army pursuing them was crushed and routed.

== Prelude ==
After their defeat at Cebu, the surviving Cebuano Katipunero forces under general Arcadio Maxílom retreated to the mountains of central Cebu. As the commander of the revolutionary command in Cebu after the death of León Kilat, Maxílom reorganized and regrouped the rebel forces in the mountains, intent on going back to the offensive to take some of the towns in the province. Thus done, he once again attacked, taking the town of Tuburan. The Spanish army, intent of securing the whole island, had difficulty penetrating the heavily forested mountains but managed to find the rebel base near the Budla-an Falls in the town of Talamban (which is annexed by Cebu City in 1934 and is now one of its barangays). One rebel named Damaso Tablasa from the town of San Nicolas (now Brgy. Basak, Cebu City) blew his conch shell upon seeing the arriving Spanish forces to alert the rest of the Cebuano rebels, and they successfully prepared for the battle.

== Battle ==
Defending the Filipino base camp in the hills at Budla-an were generals Alejo Miñoza and Lorenzo Eje. They divided their forces into two halves, with Eje leading the half on the hill, while Miñoza leads the other half on the base of the hill. Captain Garcia, leading the Spanish army, also divides his force into two, with the other half, being composed of cavalry, assigned to attack the rebel force at the base of the hill. The Spanish cavalry squadron then galloped to attack Miñoza and his unit who then promptly retreated to the forests. The pursuit continued until the Spanish horsemen found themselves surrounded by 200 Cebuano warriors on foot wielding bolo swords. The Cebuano rebels then promptly counterattacked in melee range, and, proving their proficiency in the usage of bladed weapons, inflicting losses on the Spaniards several times higher than they have suffered, at least 70 dead compared to 6 dead and 10 wounded on their own side, and thus succeeding in forcing the Spanish forces to withdraw from the field in disarray.

== Aftermath ==
After their victory at Budla-an, the Cebuano rebel forces managed to score more victories elsewhere in Cebu, including the bloody battle at Liloan which killed a high-ranking Spanish officer leading a force of loyalists.

== See also ==
- Battle of Tres de Abril
