= Beverly Hills, Cebu City =

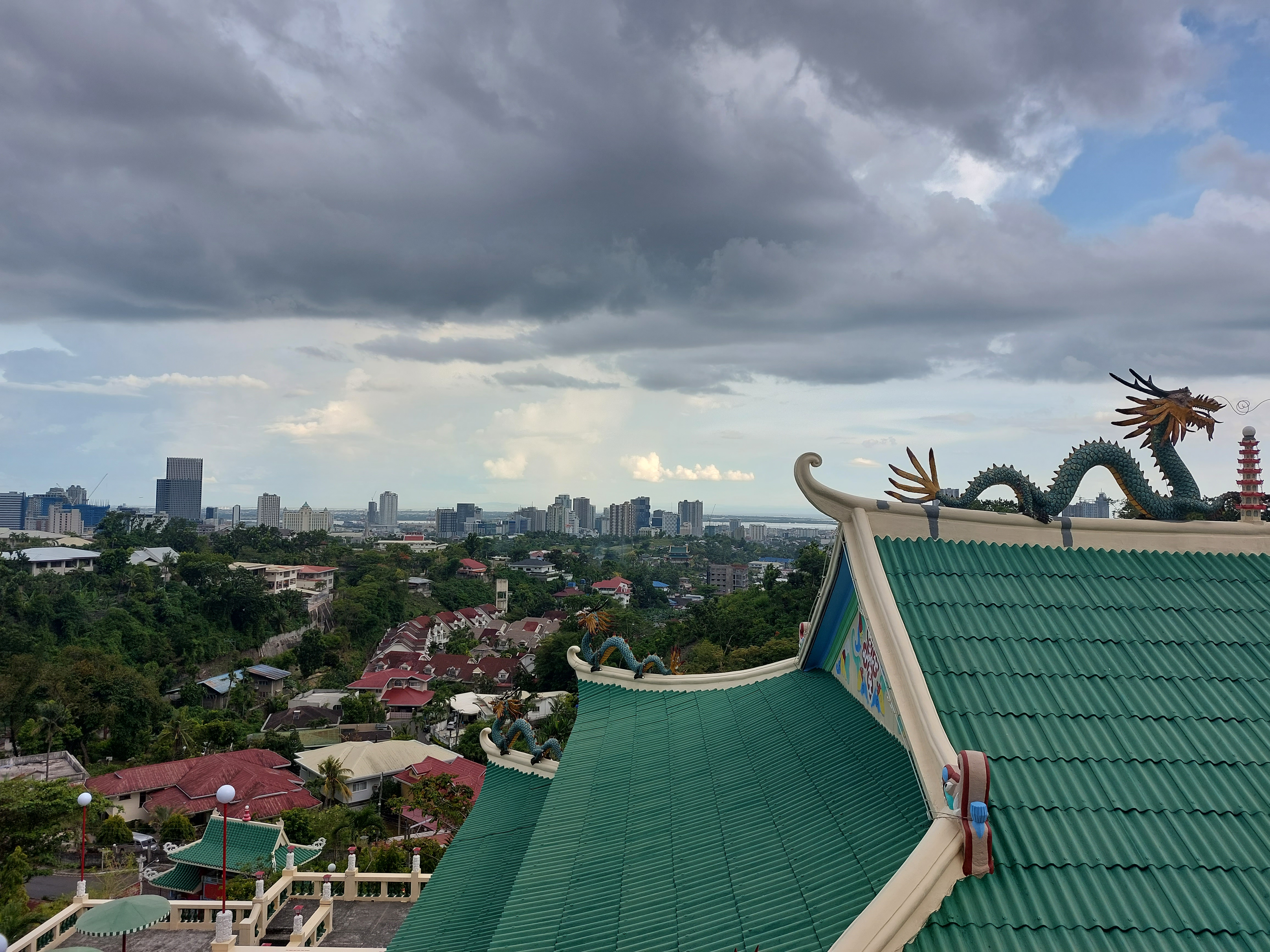
- View of Beverly Hills from the Cebu Taoist Temple

- Location within Philippines
- Coordinates: 10°20′3″N 123°53′21″E
- Country: Philippines
- City: Cebu City
- Barangay: Lahug
- Time zone: UTC+8 (PST)

Beverly Hills is an upscale residential subdivision development in Lahug, Cebu City, Philippines built on hilly terrain that gives wide views of the city. It was named after Beverly Hills, California.

== Location ==
The subdivision is in Barangay Lahug, Cebu City, and was once covered by mature forest. Beverly Hills was created in the 1960s, and was the first large, planned subdivision in Cebu City. It was marketed to affluent residents. The property was named after Beverly Hills, California. Woolbright Drive, which runs through the subdivision, is named after the developer.

== Origins ==
The American entrepreneur Eddie Woolbright moved to Cebu City in 1949 and opened "Eddie's Log Cabin Coffee Shop" and "Eddie's Auto Supply". He became involved in land development, construction, water drilling and trading. He saw the potential of the Sudlon Hills in Cebu. Then-young lawyer Marcelo Fernan, who later became a senator and chief justice, showed Woolbright a property of more than 33 hectares (82 acres) of undeveloped land owned by the heirs of Arlie Pond.

Woodbright bought the land and used army surplus equipment to bulldoze tracts for development. His effort to carve lots out of the mountain was seen as crazy at the time. Woolbright donated his improvements to the property through grading and filling to Cebu City effective 29 May 1969.

== Properties ==
Beverly Hills contains upscale homes with expansive views of downtown Cebu City. Some properties are worth over P30 million, and are owned by some of the richest and most powerful families of the city. The subdivision contains a Taoist Temple set on a hillside, with many terraces, tiers and steps, stone rails and curved roofs. It is guarded by bright red and yellow dragons. The temple looks down on some of the wealthy people's properties.

== Access rights dispute ==
In 2014 Cebu City mayor Mike Rama was asked to resolve a dispute between residents of Barangay Kalunasan and the Beverly Hills homeowners association. In response to a rise in crime in the area, the homeowners association was preventing non-residents from entering the subdivision between 10 p.m. and 8 a.m. Armed guards had manned barriers and prevented access to cars after hours without a resident's sticker.

The Kalunasan residents claimed that the road had been donated to the city, and the homeowners association had no right to restrict access. The lots for several roads that crossed the subdivision were given to the City of Cebu by a deed that was dated 17 March 1976.

In November 2015 the Regional Trial Court enjoined the Beverly Hills Association from restricting access to the public roads in the subdivision to residents of Grand Legacy Veterans Village and of Upper Kalunasan.

== Sources ==
- "About Lahug, Cebu City", Cebu City Tour
- Chua, Paolo (21 July 2018), "How Much It Costs to Live in Cebu's Most Luxurious Villages", Esquire.ph
- Lee, Alexander (2016-09-28), Cebu: Impressions, Digressions & Perambulations, Booktango, ISBN 978-1-4689-7393-8
- Manto, Mylen O. (11 November 2015), "Court directs homeowners' group to open roads to public", philstar
- Oaminal, Clarence Paul (2015-07-08), "Woolbright Drive, Beverly Hills, Cebu City", The Freeman
- Ramos Cantalejo, Linette (13 May 2014), "Who owns Beverly Hills' roads?", SunStar Philippines
- Razon, Conchita C. (18 February 2018), "Revisiting the Cebu I missed", Philippine Daily Inquirer
- Taylor, Janine; Borromeo, Katsy; Sanchez, Mikey; Gaw-Yu, Nicolette (2011), "The Gift that Keeps on Giving", Zee.ph
- Ynclino, Flor S. (19 April 2009), "Unveiling of Eddie Woolbright's Bust", philstar Global, The Philippine Star
