= Balut (game) =

Dice game

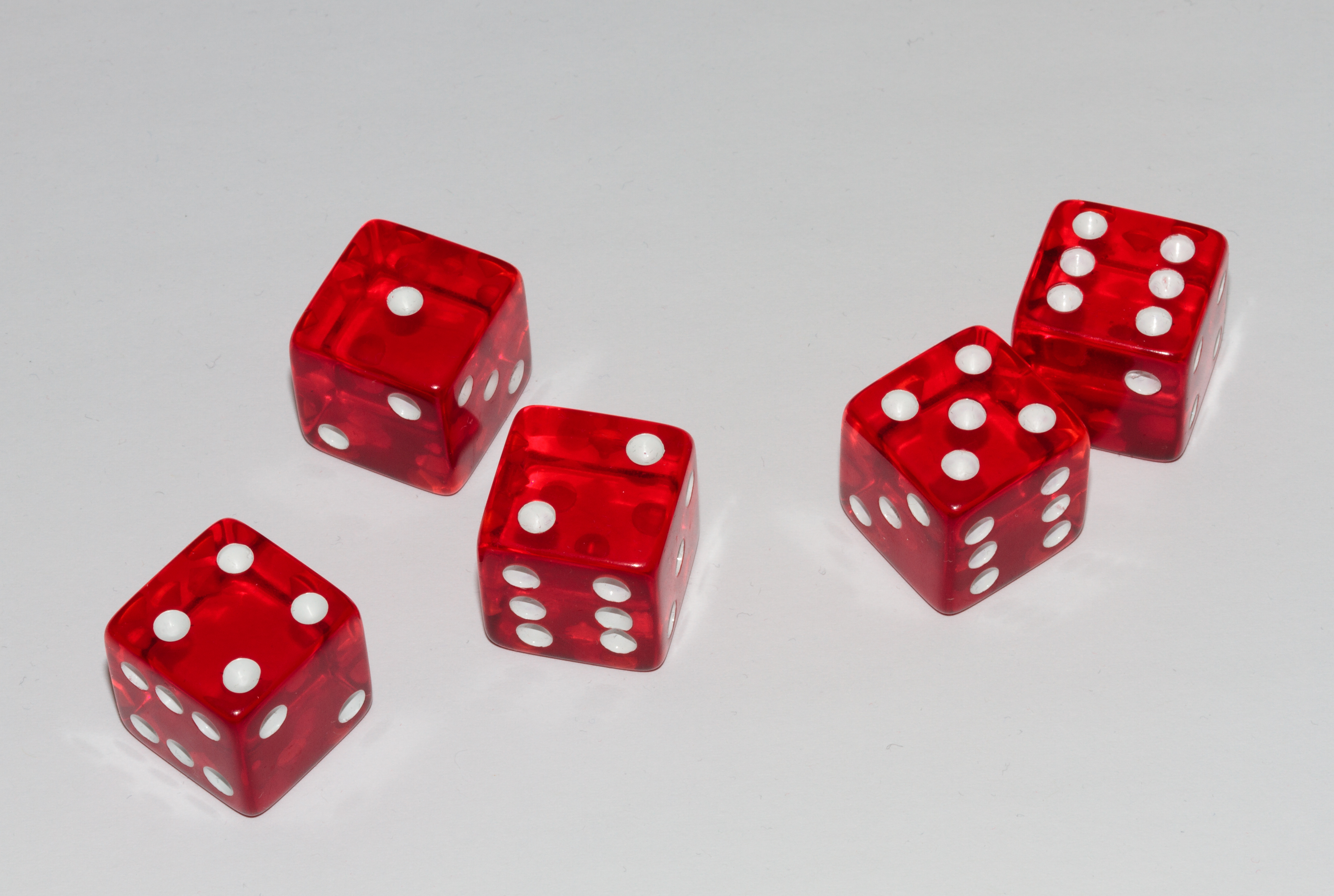
Balut is played with five six-sided dice

Balut is a game of dice, similar to Yahtzee, created by United States soldiers as an alternative to poker, and is a popular pastime of businessmen overseas.

The game is named after a delicacy made from the fetal duck egg available in some Southeast Asian countries.

== Origin and initial spread of the game ==
Edgar "Eddie" Woolbright was an American soldier stationed in the Philippines who remained there for the rest of his life, becoming a successful local businessman. The origin story that is recounted for the game by its players is that two U.S. soldiers were in one of Woolbright's early establishments in Tacloban, the Woolbright Tacloban Airline Hotel, stuck for a drinking/gambling game to play because they had no playing cards but wanted to play poker. They settled on playing poker with dice rather than cards, inventing what they initially called "poker dice".

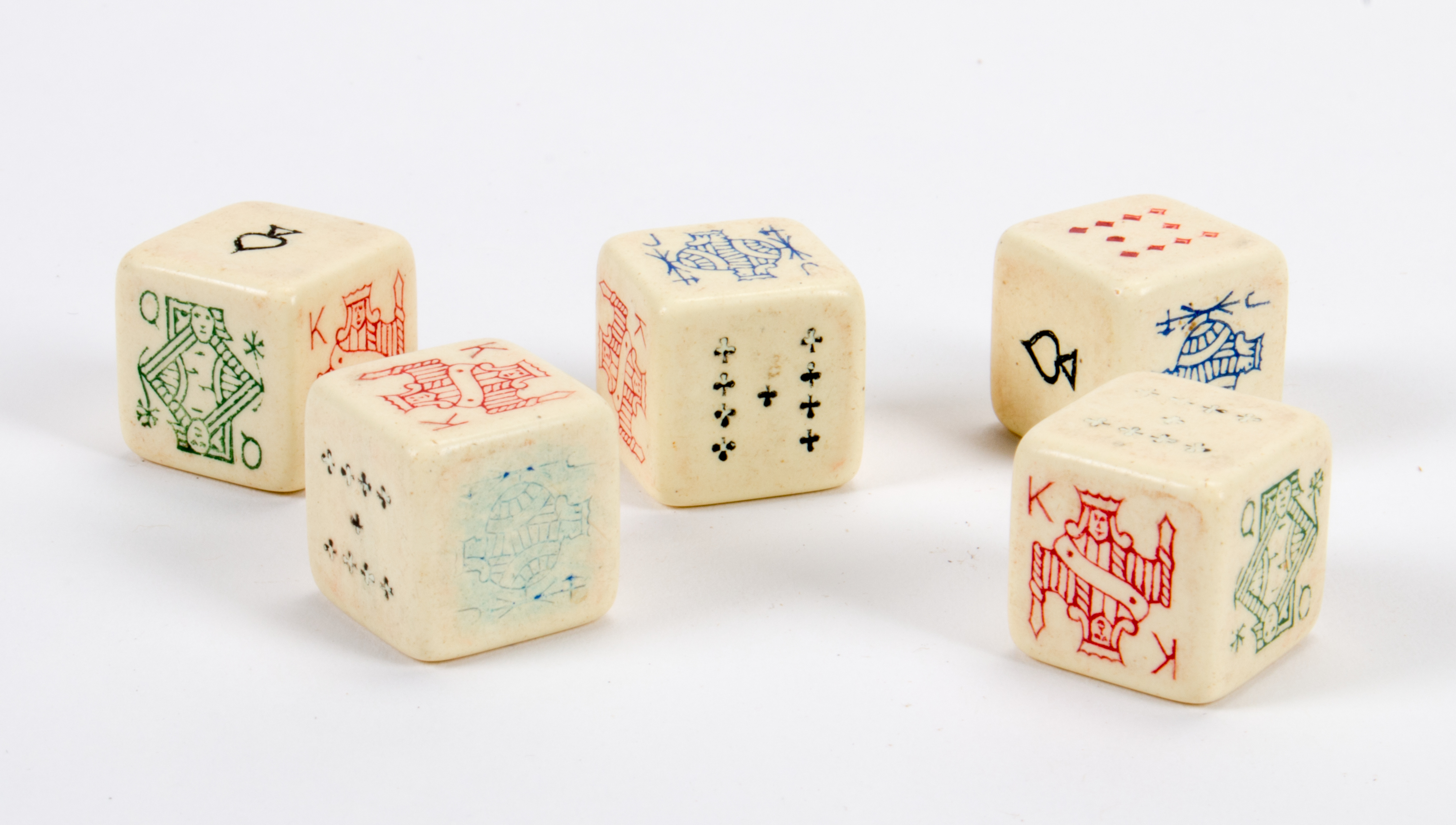
A set of poker dice from the 1940s, of the type originally used for balut

Originally the game's format only extended to two players, but some Europeans staying at the same hotel who also wanted to play extended the game to more than two players. The "poker dice" game gained its current name when Woolbright and some players out on a walk one day, hearing the cries of "balut!" by balut egg vendors, decided that that would be the name of the game. Woolbright took the game from Tacloban to his later establishments in the Philippines as his businesses grew, and also played it at the British Club in Cebu City. Other people exported it elsewhere: a British captain named Tony Church to Singapore, and some expatriate Scandinavians to Thailand.

An International Balut Federation was created in 1972.

The international Danish community has taken the game as a popular method of social interaction abroad and at home, with Danish expatriates/businessmen gathering to play the game monthly. Rules of the game, code of conduct including dress code are enforced by participants and by the gamemasters, and games are organized by members of the International Balut Federation, or IBF.

== Play ==
The game involves rolling five dice up to 3 times to make various combinations, which are noted on a scorecard. A Balut is a five-of-a-kind of any denomination, but unlike in Yahtzee it counts for little in terms of points. Players who obtain a Balut announce it to the other players by calling out "Balut!" – similar to calling out "Bingo!", and note it on a special scorecard. Players try to guess before gameplay how many Baluts will be made during the game; correctly guessing the total number can earn a prize.

On a turn, player may roll the dice up to three times. After a roll, player may take one or more dice out of play to save their result and then roll the remaining dice. There are seven scoring combinations that the player may only achieve once. At the end of the turn, the player will score per the combo created. If the player cannot create a combo, then player must scratch one of their remaining unfulfilled combos. That scratched combo is no longer playable for the remainder of the game. Play then continues to the left until all players have completed the 7 combo possibilities with a score or a scratch. Further rounds may be played...high score wins.

Possible Combinations:

- Fours - Scores 4 points for each four.
- Fives - Scores 5 points for each five.
- Sixes - Scores 6 points for each six.
- Straight - Scores 50 points for a five dice sequence, i.e., one-two-three-four-five or two-three-four-five-six.
- House - One triple plus one pair - scores sum of all five dice.
- Choice - Scores sum of all five dice.
- Balut - Five of a kind - Scores 30 points.

=== South East Asia variation ===
In 1973, the game was brought into Singapore and a set of rules was established at Singapore Town Club in 1978. This set of rules was later spread to other private clubs in Singapore and to other Southeast Asian countries such as Malaysia, Thailand and Philippines. Although the Singapore Town Club ceased regular operations around 1998–2000, with its status recorded as unknown by that time, other clubs continue the name for the tournament. These Clubs organize regular local and international tournaments as well as gathering together each year for the STC Balut Interport Championship. The 28th was held at the British Club Bangkok in 2008 and the 29th was held at the Sabah Golf & Country Club in 2009. In 2017 the international competition was held at the Sarawak Club in Kuching, Sarawak, Malaysia.

In 2010 the 30th STC Interport Competition was held at the British Club Bangkok on 19 to 21 November.

In 2013, the competition was held at the British Club, Bangkok. In May 2022, following a 2 year gap, the 36 th Inter Club Balut Competition was held in Singapore. 17 teams from 6 clubs participated in the competition. As of 2024, the 38 th Interclub Balut Tournament is currently being held with clubs from Malaysia such as Kinabalu Club competing with clubs from Singapore.
