= Manilita =

Mango cultivar

Mangifera 'Manilita'
- Genus: Mangifera
- Species: Mangifera indica
- Cultivar: 'Manilita'
- Origin: Mexico

The 'Manilita' mango is a named mango cultivar that originated in Mexico.

== History ==
Manilita came from the Pacific coast of southern Mexico. It is descended from the Philippine mango variety brought from Manila, Philippines (hence the name Manilita, which means "little Manila"). This was possible through the Galleon Trade that existed between Manila and Acapulco, Mexico (1565–1815).

Manilita was introduced to the United States, where it has gained acceptance as a dooryard cultivar for home growing due to its small growth habit and fruit color. It was listed as a curator's choice mango at the Fairchild Tropical Botanic Garden's 2010 International Mango Festival in Miami, Florida, and has been promoted by Fairchild for its positive characteristics.

A Manilita tree is planted in the collection of the USDA's mango germplasm repository in Miami, Florida.

== Description ==
The fruit average less than a pound in weight at maturity and are elongated in shape similar to southeast Asian-descended cultivars. The skin turns a pastel red color, and the flesh is fiberless and sweet. In Florida, the fruit ripen early.

Trees are small and can be maintained at a height of 7 feet, lending to Manilita's labeling as a "condo mango".

== See also ==
- Ataulfo (similar parentage)
- Carabao (parent)
- Galleon trade
