= Dried mango =

Preserved fruit food product

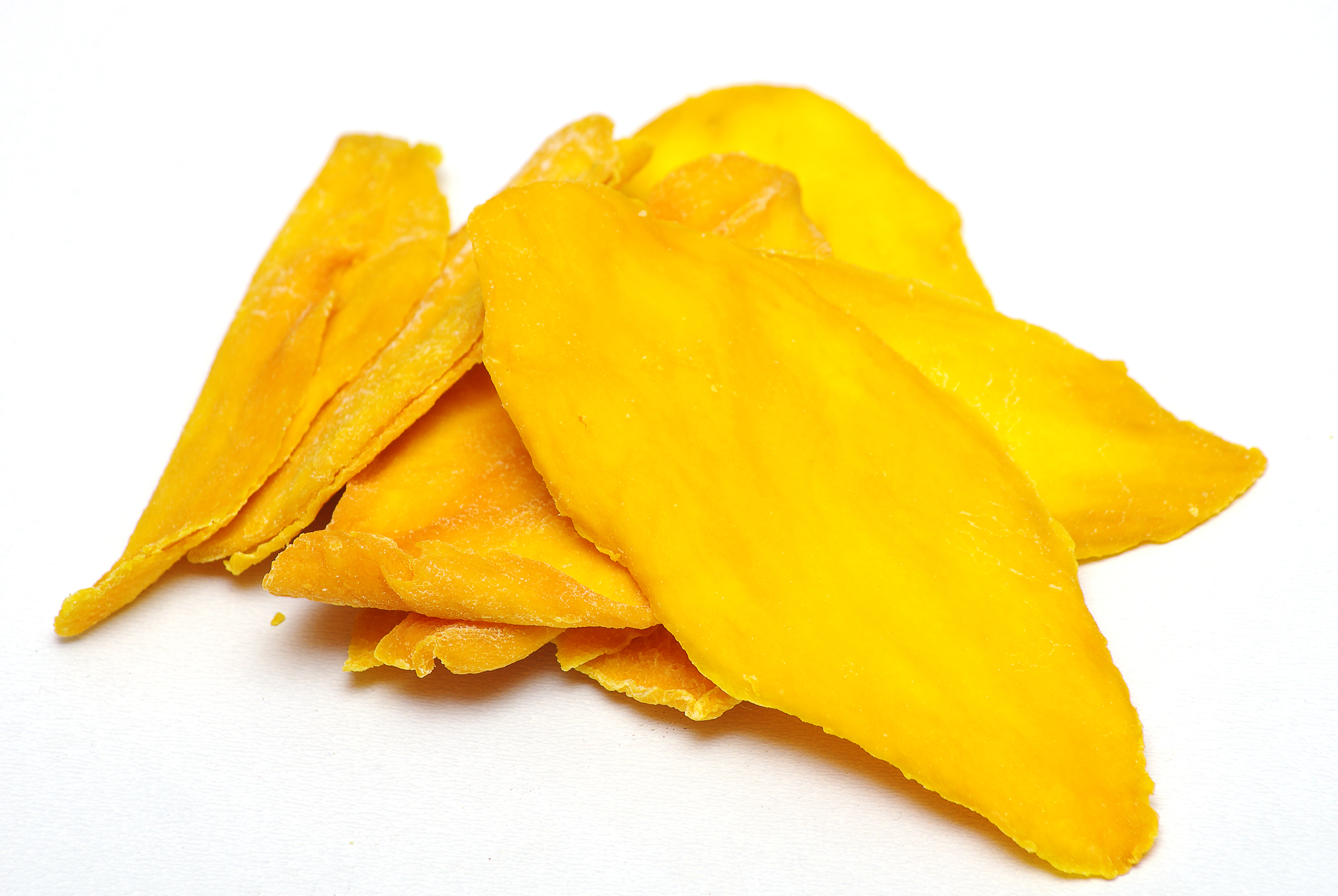
Dried mango

Dried mango is a preserved fruit product made by removing moisture from fresh mango slices through drying methods such as sun-drying or dehydration. It has a chewy texture and concentrated sweetness, often with a slightly tangy flavor. Dried mango is commonly consumed as a snack and may be sold plain or with added sugar, sulfur dioxide (for preservation), or spices. It is valued for its long shelf life and nutritional content, including fiber and vitamins.

== Process ==
Before the drying process begins, the mango that has been sliced will usually have moisture on the surface. Hot air drying is a major method of processing agricultural and sideline products, its principle being that hot air is flowing into the chamber to heat the material and speed up the flow of air so that the water drains away quickly and lets the mango slices dry. In the drying process, warm air that has little moisture will be used to pick up the moisture on the surface of the sliced mango. As the water on the surface is being evaporated, the water from inside the mango is also being drawn out to the surface to replace the lost moisture. The process of water being drawn out from the center of the material to the surface is called diffusion. Then the moisture will also be taken away by the warm air. As moisture is being drawn out to the surface, moisture on the surface will be less visible until it reached a point where the surface will no longer look wet. The rate of moisture removal will also be slower as time goes on. As moisture is being drained out of the mango, its cellular structure will begin to break down, causing the mango to shrink. At high temperature, moisture can be drawn out too quickly that a thick hard layer is formed in the surface of the mango. The thick layer will trap moisture inside the mango, making it difficult to entirely dehydrate the mango. This phenomenon of developing hard skin-like outer layer is called case-hardening.

Case hardening is the result of a large amount of heat dehydrated production, which hardens the exterior of the fruit or vegetable, making it difficult to avoid moisture crumb. The food dried at a very high temperature, the outer surface will harden, preventing moisture from escaping through the center of the slice. The food shrinks when it dries, so fine hemp should be used for small fruits. This results in the fruit center remaining moist and then being prone to spoilage during storage.

== Nutrients ==
Mangos are a rich source of Vitamin C. The nutritional value differs slightly from that of a fresh mango as a result of the drying process. The Vitamin C content is reduced, but the dried fruit still contains a significant amount of fibre and antioxidants.

100 grams of dried mango contains about 314 calories, in which carbohydrates are the main source of calories, followed by protein and fat. Dried mango has 20% of the daily value for Vitamin A and notable content of Vitamin B and E. However, most of the Vitamin C in the mango is lost during the process of dehydration; it carries only 2% of the daily value. Minerals such as phosphorus can be found in dried mangoes.

With additional process of blanching, dried mango can retain the content of its carotenoids and vitamin C.

As with other fruits, mangoes contain antioxidants, such as mangiferin. These may help protect cells in the human body from radical damage associated with diabetes, cancer, and aging.

== Storage ==
While mangos can be stored for around five days, dried mangos can be stored for a lot longer depending on a variety of factors, such as the best by date, the drying method, and how the dried mango is stored. Dried mangos keep fresh in a refrigerator or in a pantry in tightly closed containers to keep out moisture and other contaminants. Unopened dried mango stored in the pantry can be stored between 6–12 months. If stored in the refrigerator, it can be stored for 1–2 years. When frozen, it can be stored for longer. However it is best to check for signs to see whether the fruit has gone bad.

Freezing dried mango is supposedly able to extend the shelf life indefinitely. But like most foods, after a long period of time, it can break down and develop freezer burn. The freezer time shown is only for the best quality where the dried mango is kept frozen at 0 °F continuously.

Any spoiled dried mangoes should be removed from the freezer to avoid affecting the others. The best way to detect spoilage is to look at and smell the dried mangoes: anything that has an odor or visible mold should be discarded. Common traits of dried mango going bad are discolouration, hardness, and loss of flavour.

== See also ==
- Mango powder, used as a citrusy seasoning
