= Ataulfo (mango) =

Mango variety produced in Mexico

Ataúlfo mango
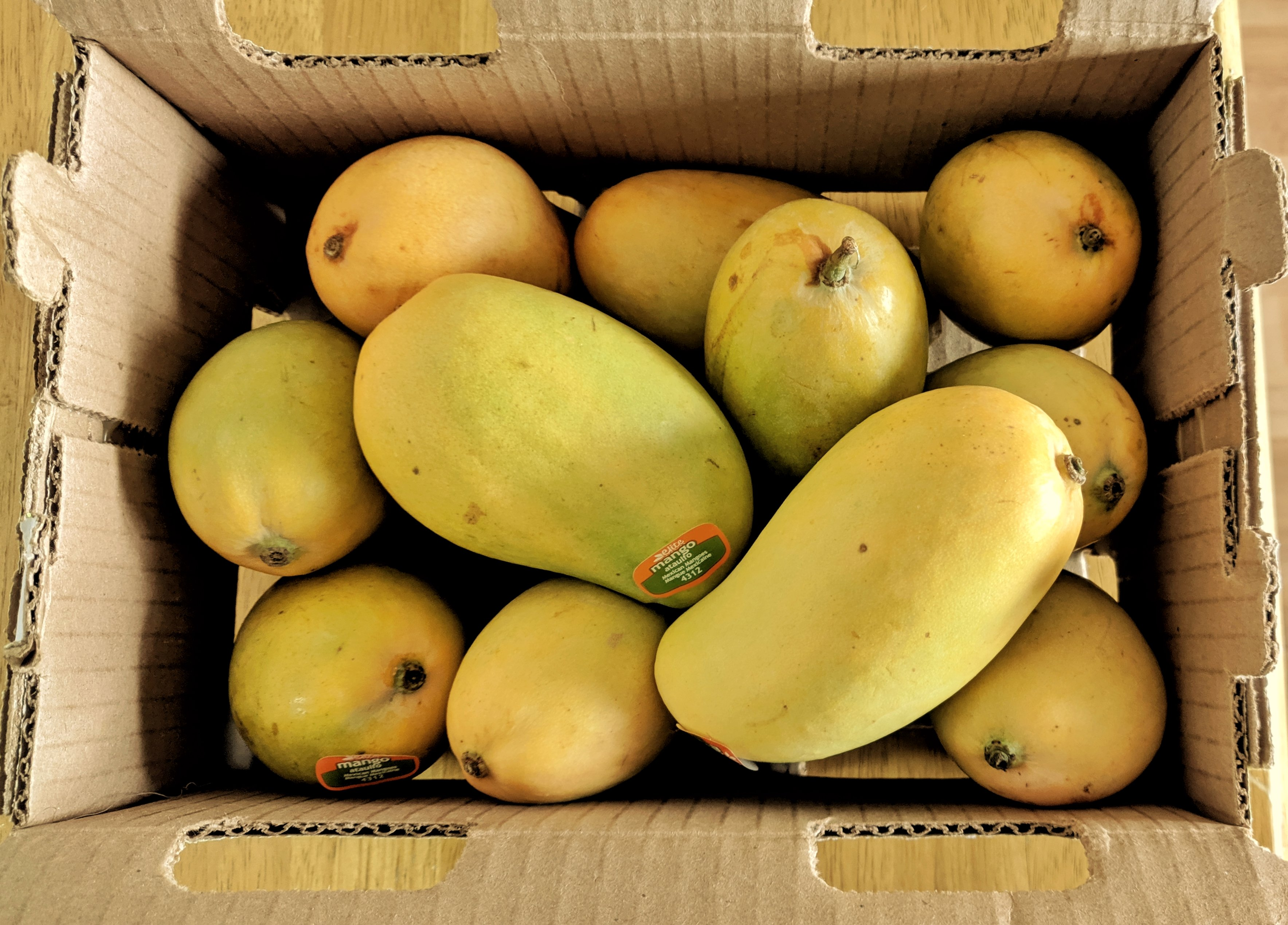
- Genus: Mangifera
- Species: indica
- Cultivar: Ataúlfo
- Marketing names: Champagne
- Origin: Soconusco, Chiapas, Mexico

The Ataúlfo mango is a mango cultivar from Mexico. Ataúlfo mangos are golden yellow and generally weigh between 6 and 10 ounces (170 and 280 g), with a somewhat sigmoid shape ("S"-shaped) and a gold-yellow skin. The flesh is not fibrous, and the pit is thin. They were named for grower Ataúlfo Morales Gordillo. Since August 27, 2003, the Ataúlfo mango is one of the 18 Mexican Designations of Origin.

== Origin ==
The Mexican Institute of Industrial Property (Instituto Mexicano de la Propiedad Industrial) granted the designation of origin of this fruit to the government of Chiapas. Along with the Manilita mango, it is a descendant of the Philippine mango cultivar introduced from the Philippines to Mexico before 1779 through the Manila-Acapulco galleon trade. It was crossed with other mango varieties, resulting in the Ataúlfo. Regardless, Ataúlfo remains a Philippine-type mango, characterized by being polyembryonic (as opposed to the Indian-type which is monoembryonic).

In 2003, the Mexican government, through the Official Gazette, published Comunicado No. 14 – 2003 titled "Abstract of the application for the declaration (protection) of the Appellation of Origin: Mango Ataúlfo del Soconusco Chiapas", a declaration that the term "Mango Ataúlfo del Soconusco Chiapas" is an appellation of origin for a specific kind of mango fruit produced in several regions of Chiapas, Mexico where the Ataúlfo mango was first grown.

== Description ==
Ataulfo mangoes are mango distinguished by their smooth, non-fibrous texture and rich, sweet flavor. The flavor has little tartness, and may be described as having hints of peach, pineapple, and floral undertones, contributing to a fragrant and aromatic profile.

In comparison to other common mango varieties such as the Haden, Kent, or Tommy Atkins, Ataulfo mangoes have similar levels of sugar content, about 15% of fresh weight when ripe.

Ataulfo mangoes are also sold (especially in the United States) under the trade names "champagne mango", "honey mango", and "Manila mango", all of which are names which originally applied to the Philippine mango (the progenitor of the Ataulfo) in the early 20th century American colonial period of the Philippines.

== Production ==
The fruit grows in warm, moist climates with summer rains, but monsoon temperatures must not decline to 5 °C. The proper temperature for this type of mango is 28 °C with rainfall between 1090–3000 mm annually, from April to October.

The Ataúlfo mangoes originate in the Mexican states of Michoacan, Sinaloa, Nayarit, Jalisco, Veracruz and Chiapas, and are sold between March and September. Ataúlfo production was concentrated in the Soconusco coastal region. Overall, producer organizations estimated that there were 18,000 hectares of Ataúlfo mangoes in production in the state.

There are several pests that influence the growth and production of the mangoes including fruit flies and mango seed weevil.

Until 2014, Mexican Ataúlfo mangoes had not been sold in significant numbers in Europe because shipping them by air was prohibitively expensive. In December 2014, shipments by sea began via one United Kingdom importer using timed pre-ripe harvesting combined with faster sea-shipping that enabled full mango ripening while in transit. European customers are willing to pay significantly more than North American customers, if the mangos are of high quality and are sold ready-to-eat.

Ataulfo mango, raw
Nutritional value per 100 g (3.5 oz)
- Energy: 71 kcal (300 kJ)
- Carbohydrates: 17.4 g
- Sugars: 11.1
- Dietary fiber: 1.3 g
- Fat: 0.68 g
- Protein: 0.69 g
Vitamins and minerals
Vitamins	Quantity %DV^{†}
Vitamin B6	6% 0.108 mg
Vitamin C	187% 168 mg
Minerals	Quantity %DV^{†}
Calcium	1% 10 mg
Copper	11% 0.103 mg
Iron	1% 0.24 mg
Magnesium	3% 10.6 mg
Manganese	5% 0.104 mg
Phosphorus	1% 18 mg
Potassium	7% 204 mg
Selenium	1% 0.6 μg
Sodium	0% 2.4 mg
Zinc	1% 0.1 mg
- Other constituents: Quantity
- Water: 80.8 g
- Link to USDA Database entry
- ^{†}Percentages estimated using US recommendations for adults, except for potassium, which is estimated based on expert recommendation from the National Academies.

== Consumption ==
Ataúlfo mangoes were first consumed in the United States beginning in the late 1990s, though they have been a major crop in Mexico for decades. As of 2009, they were the second-most consumed variety of mango sold in the U.S., behind the Tommy Atkins. As of 2018, they represented about 20% of all mangoes imported into the U.S.

=== Nutrition ===
A raw Ataulfo mango is 81% water, 17% carbohydrates, 1% protein, and 1% fat (table). In a reference amount of 100 g (3.5 oz), raw Autaulfo mango supplies 71 calories, and is a rich source of vitamin C (187% of the Daily Value, DV) and a moderate source of copper (11% DV) (table).

The Ataulfo mango is a source of B-carotene, a provitamin A carotenoid.

=== Phytochemicals ===
Ataulfo mangoes contain diverse polyphenols, including gallic acid and catechins, and mangiferin, the contents of which fluctuate by harvest timing and growing conditions.

== See also ==
- Carabao (parent)
- Manila-Acapulco galleon trade
- Manilita mango
