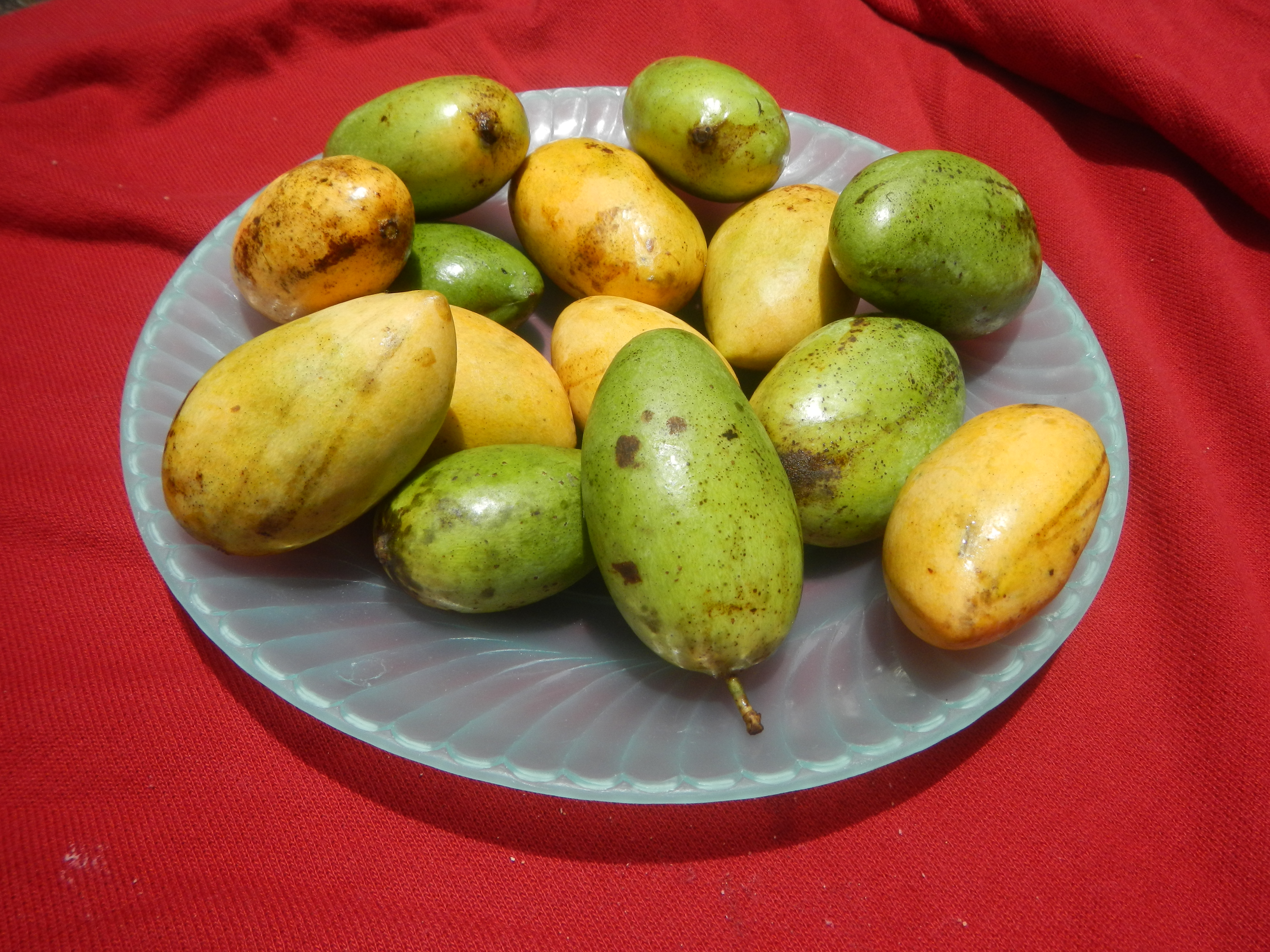
- Ripe and unripe pahutan mangoes from the Philippines
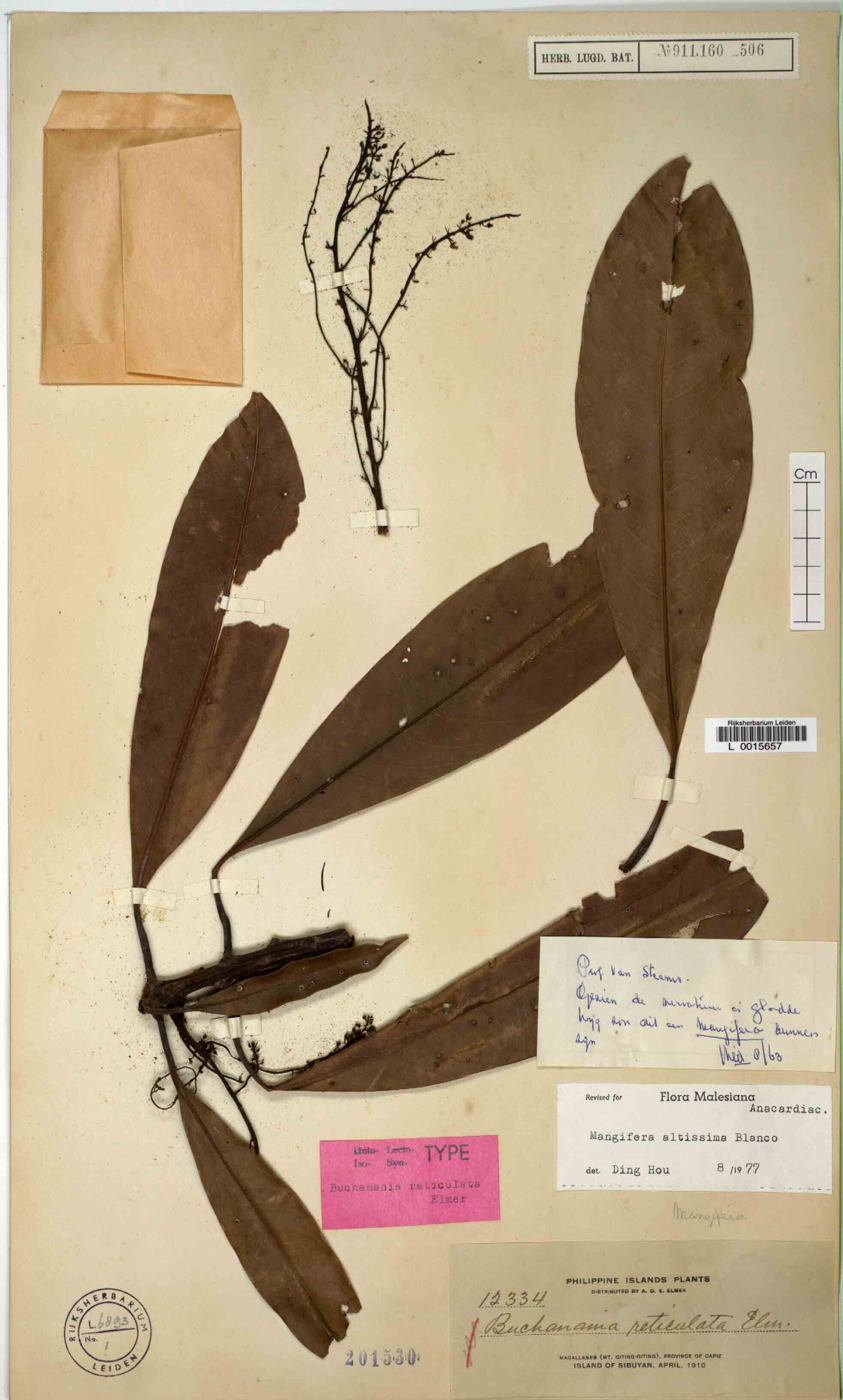
- Herbarium specimen of Mangifera altissima

Conservation status
- Data Deficient (IUCN 3.1)

Scientific classification
- Kingdom: Plantae
- Clade: Embryophytes
- Clade: Tracheophytes
- Clade: Angiosperms
- Clade: Eudicots
- Clade: Rosids
- Order: Sapindales
- Family: Anacardiaceae
- Genus: Mangifera
- Species: M. altissima

Binomial name
- Mangifera altissima Blanco

Synonyms
- Mangifera mucronulata Blume; Mangifera rumphii Pierre

= Mangifera altissima =

Species of flowering plant

Mangifera altissima (commonly known as pahutan, paho, or pajo), is a species of mango native to the Philippines and surrounding regions in Indonesia, Malaysia, Papua New Guinea and the Solomon Islands. It is not grown commercially but is harvested from the wild in the Philippines. It has small fruits that are pale yellow when ripe and are very sweet, though much more fibrous than commercially cultivated Mangifera indica species like Carabao mangoes. It is threatened by habitat loss.

In the Philippines, pahutan mangoes are eaten ripe as is, or eaten with rock salt or used in salads when unripe.
