= Reniform =

Reniform ('kidney-shaped') may refer to:

- Reniform habit, a type of crystal shape
- Reniform leaf, a plant leaf shape
- Reniform seed, a plant seed shape
- Reniform stigma, a spot on the wings of certain moths

== See also ==
- Runiform (disambiguation)
