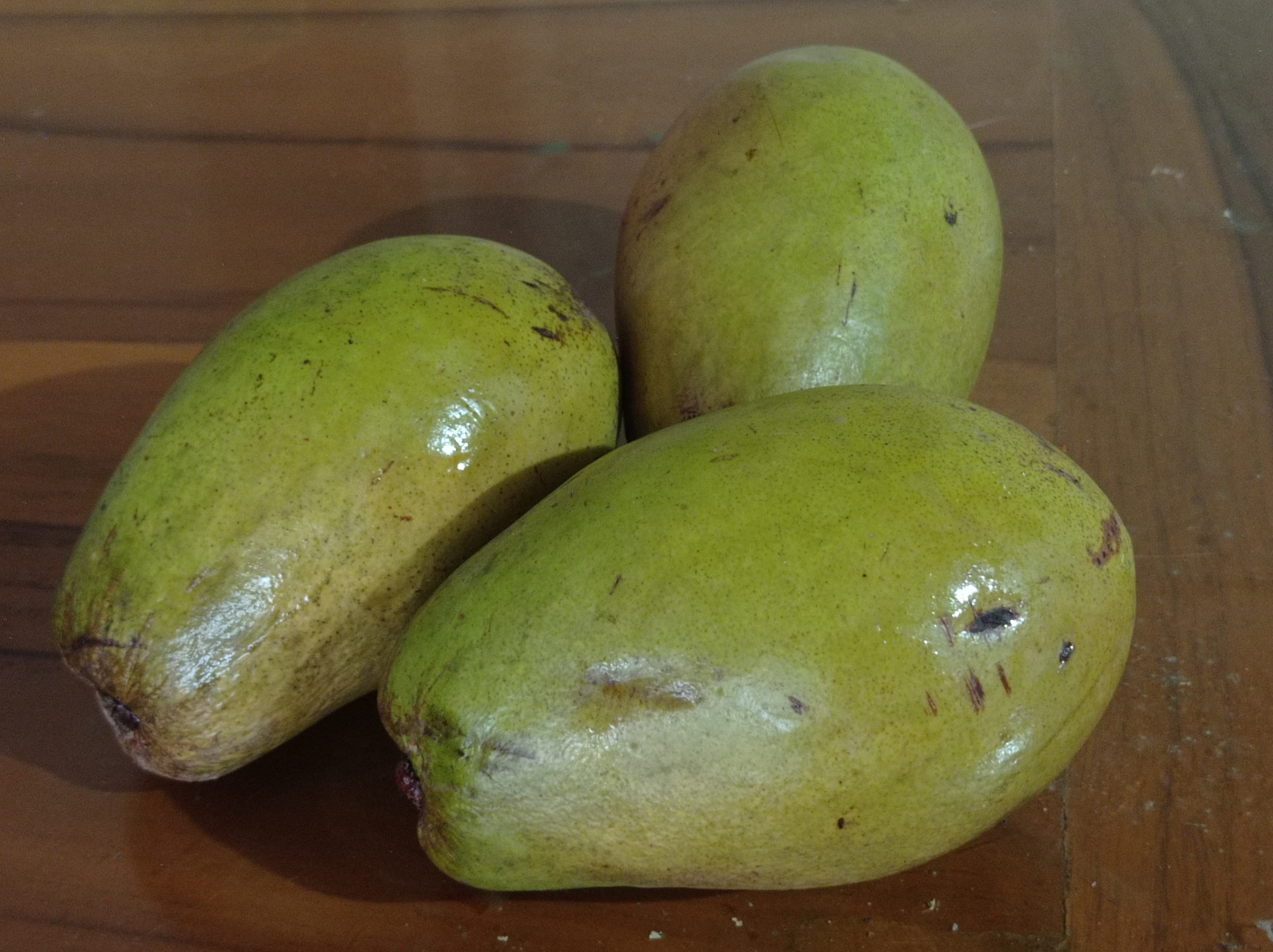

Conservation status
- Near Threatened (IUCN 3.1)

Scientific classification
- Kingdom: Plantae
- Clade: Embryophytes
- Clade: Tracheophytes
- Clade: Spermatophytes
- Clade: Angiosperms
- Clade: Eudicots
- Clade: Rosids
- Order: Sapindales
- Family: Anacardiaceae
- Genus: Mangifera
- Species: M. caesia

Binomial name
- Mangifera caesia Jack

Synonyms
- Mangifera kemanga Blume; Mangifera membranacea Blume; Mangifera polycarpa Griff. Mangifera taipa Buch.-Ham. Mangifera utana Buch.-Ham. Mangifera verticillata C.B.Rob.

= Mangifera caesia =

Species of fruit and plant

Mangifera caesia is a species of flowering plant in the cashew family, Anacardiaceae. Known in English as jack or white mango, among other names. It belongs to the same genus as the mango and is widely cultivated in areas of Indonesia, Malaysia, Singapore, Brunei, Papua New Guinea and the Philippines.

It was featured in Malaysian stamp, printed in 1999 as a postage stamp in the rare fruits series.

== Names ==
M. caesia is locally known as binjai (Malay language), wani (Balinese language/Dusun language), yaa-lam (Thai language), bayuno/baluno/belunok (Filipino language), mangga wani (Cebuano language/Sabah language), and gwani (Subanen language).

== Description ==
These are restricted to wet lowlands at below 450 metres (1,480 ft). It requires rainfall and is rarely in found forests but rather abundant in marshes and riverside areas. Grows up to 30 m (98 ft) tall with a dense crown of round-shaped leaves. The flowers are purple or pink, 0.7 centimetres (0.28 in) long with five sepals. The fruit is a large, edible, elliptical drupe 10–15 cm (4–6 in) long and 6–8 cm (2.5–3 in) wide. The skin is thin and green or brown with darker patches, and the flesh is yellow-white, mushy, and strongly odorous with an acid-sweet or sour taste. The binjai is believed to originate from the island of Borneo, but is commonly grown elsewhere for its edible fruit. The tree is one of the most common and valuable Mangifera species in western Malaysia, where it is cultivated extensively in orchards. It is also widely grown in Bali, Sumatra, and Borneo.

== Reproduction ==
This tree produces thousand of fruits, ripening three months after anthesis. The fruit matures during the rainy season, this is a deciduous, stands erect and bare before shedding large bud scales that envelops twigs and inflorescence.

== Propagation method ==
It is propagated from seeds or through marcotting. Grafting on the seedling stock is also possible through inarching potted rootstocks onto twigs of mother trees. The mature tree requires abundant space, about 12 to 16 metres (39 to 52 ft) in either direction.

== Culinary uses ==
The fruit of the M. caesia can be served fresh, preserved or cooked. They can be eaten dipped in chili and dark soy sauce. In Bali, it is used as an ingredient for local creamy juices, also for making spice base for chillies sambal which is eaten with river fish. it can also be used in making pickles. The wood is used for light construction.

In Brunei, where it is called binjai, the fruit is used to make a variety of cacah or dipping sauce for ambuyat, a sago dish considered to be the country's national dish.

== As irritant ==
Like that of Mango, the sap of M. caesia can cause skin eruptions or dermatitis. Its unripe fruits' sap can also cause irritation.
