= List of barangays in Cebu City =

Political map of Cebu City

Cebu City has 80 barangays. The city is divided into two legislative districts, with 46 barangays to the north (1st District) and 34 barangays to the south (2nd District), for the purposes of electing members to the House of Representatives of the Philippines and the Sangguniang Panlungsod.

By the 2024 census, out of the total 80 barangays, there are 58 classified as urban barangays where 887,593 (91.95%) of Cebu City's population lives, while the remaining 22 are classified as rural with 77,739 residents, representing 8.05% of the total population.

The most populous barangays in the city, as of the 2024 census, are Guadalupe (70,076), Tisa (46,812), and Lahug (46,002), while Kalubihan is the least populous barangay with only 621 residents.

== List of barangays ==
Barangays of Cebu City
Administration				Population			Area (sq. km.)	Popn. Density	PSGC Code and Class	
Barangay	Geographic District	Legislative District	Barangay Captain (As of December 15, 2025)	2024	2020	Change	2020	2020	Code	Urban/Rural
Adlaon	North	I	Gemma B. Arcayan	4,378	4,413	−0.79%	10.57	417.6	072217001	Rural
Agsungot	North	I	Pedro P. Damaolao	2,616	2,772	−5.63%	3.141	882.5	072217002	Rural
Apas	North	I	Virgil A. Cabigon	23,819	24,194	−1.55%	1.925	12,571	072217003	Urban
Babag	South	II	Cesar B. Dolorito	6,289	5,945	+5.79%	9.127	651.3	072217004	Rural
Bacayan	North	I	Jenelyn R. Leyson	12,712	14,460	−12.09%	1.247	11,591	072217006	Urban
Banilad	North	I	Lea O. Japson	7,124	6,336	+12.44%	2.362	2,683	072217007	Urban
Basak Pardo	South	II	Isidro F. Tumulak Jr.	18,667	17,854	+4.55%	2.280	7,831	072217005	Urban
Basak San Nicolas	South	II	Norman A. Navarro	37,118	38,965	−4.74%	1.482	26,284	072217008	Urban
Binaliw	North	I	Viviane O. Ruste	3,086	3,493	−11.65%	5.160	676.9	072217010	Rural
Bonbon	South	II	Grace M. Duragos	7,249	6,108	+18.68%	9.336	654.3	072217011	Urban
Budlaan	North	I	Nerissa G. Antolihao	7,602	8,756	−13.18%	5.528	1,584	072217013	Urban
Buhisan	South	II	Gremar C. Barete	19,683	19,088	+3.12%	7.362	2,593	072217014	Urban
Bulacao	South	II	Junah B. Abellanosa	27,337	28,675	−4.67%	4.458	6,432	072217015	Urban
Buot	South	II	Rosalita D. Callino	2,958	2,927	+1.06%	6.310	463.9	072217016	Rural
Busay	North	I	Eliodoro A. Sanchez	16,465	17,145	−3.97%	9.074	1,890	072217017	Urban
Calamba	South	II	Ester G. Concha	10,517	9,834	+6.95%	0.4613	21,320	072217018	Urban
Cambinocot	North	I	Reynald A. Lauron	3,897	3,424	+13.81%	5.404	633.6	072217019	Rural
Capitol Site	North	I	Kelly M. Quijada	11,065	12,604	−12.21%	0.7943	15,869	072217020	Urban
Carreta	North	I	Mariano V. Ando	11,313	11,398	−0.75%	0.9445	12,068	072217021	Urban
Cogon Pardo	South	II	Jay A. Bacalso	24,298	23,828	+1.97%	1.534	15,533	072217024	Urban
Cogon Ramos	North	I	Ma. Luisa E. Besabella	9,902	2,693	+267.69%	0.2951	9,125	072217023	Urban
Day‑as	North	I	Freddie T. Esmas	3,794	3,815	−0.55%	0.1061	35,953	072217025	Urban
Duljo Fatima	South	II	Nobie A. Cabatino	14,533	15,851	−8.31%	0.4036	39,272	072217027	Urban
Ermita	North	I	Mark Rizaldy V. Miral	8,718	8,541	+2.07%	0.3771	22,650	072217028	Urban
Guadalupe	South	II	Apol Ross G. Enriquez	70,076	70,039	+0.05%	7.364	9,510	072217029	Urban
Guba	North	I	Orlan B. Herrera	4,255	5,732	−25.77%	10.82	529.7	072217030	Rural
Hipodromo	North	I	Ruperto B. Bacolod Jr.	11,291	9,574	+17.93%	0.4307	22,230	072217031	Urban
Inayawan	South	II	Kirk Bryan J. Repollo	34,259	32,675	+4.85%	2.753	11,868	072217032	Urban
Kalubihan	North	I	Rex Y. Millan	621	663	−6.33%	0.1614	4,108	072217033	Urban
Kalunasan	South	II	Carlitos E. Ceniza	29,458	28,230	+4.35%	1.420	19,879	072217034	Urban
Kamagayan	North	I	Raquel E. Avila	1,891	2,004	−5.64%	0.1171	17,115	072217035	Urban
Kamputhaw (Camputhaw)	North	I	Jessica P. Cadungog	23,899	17,664	+35.30%	1.216	14,532	072217036	Urban
Kasambagan	North	I	Franklyn O. Ong	10,128	7,967	+27.12%	1.833	4,347	072217037	Urban
Kinasang‑an Pardo	South	II	Susan B. Enriquez	17,954	18,756	−4.28%	1.509	12,426	072217038	Urban
Labangon	South	II	Derrick C. Yap	36,373	32,825	+10.81%	1.122	29,255	072217040	Urban
Lahug	North	I	Hazel Ann M. Empleo	46,002	45,853	+0.32%	4.239	10,816	072217041	Urban
Lorega San Miguel	North	I	Nilo A. Dela Cerna	10,025	12,273	−18.32%	0.1996	61,479	072217042	Urban
Lusaran	North	I	Agustin P. Partulan	2,670	2,595	+2.89%	11.21	231.6	072217043	Rural
Luz	North	I	Renato S. Labrador	13,745	16,175	−15.02%	0.5602	28,872	072217044	Urban
Mabini	North	I	Richard M. Adolfo	3,036	2,307	+31.60%	5.611	411.1	072217045	Rural
Mabolo	North	I	Daniel Francis D. Arguedo	18,339	21,616	−15.16%	1.946	11,106	072217046	Urban
Malubog	North	I	Dennis M. Dabuco	3,389	3,316	+2.20%	8.556	387.6	072217048	Rural
Mambaling	South	II	Roseller V. Salvador	26,584	30,459	−12.72%	1.249	24,386	072217049	Urban
Pahina Central	North	I	Carlo V. Yap	5,320	5,639	−5.66%	0.2576	21,891	072217050	Urban
Pahina San Nicolas	South	II	Arnulfo R. Cambonga	2,661	2,743	−2.99%	0.07540	36,379	072217051	Urban
Pamutan	South	II	Irma B. Labitad	2,111	1,773	+19.06%	11.38	155.9	072217052	Rural
Pari-an	North	I	Lucita Lazarte	1,426	1,058	+34.78%	0.09731	10,872	072217054	Urban
Paril	North	I	Neresa Villa D. Calalang	1,810	1,847	−2.00%	3.223	573.0	072217055	Rural
Pasil	South	II	Francisco S. De Gracia Jr.	8,591	8,395	+2.33%	0.07995	105,003	072217056	Urban
Pit-os	North	I	Nilo C. Tariman	6,685	7,752	−13.76%	1.654	4,688	072217057	Urban
Poblacion Pardo	South	II	Danilo C. Lim	12,217	12,016	+1.67%	2.035	5,906	072217053	Urban
Pulangbato	North	I	John Barry V. Miñoza	8,310	8,037	+3.40%	5.234	1,535	072217059	Rural
Pung-ol Sibugay	South	II	Jose U. Cadampog	2,876	2,333	+23.27%	14.62	159.6	072217060	Rural
Punta Princesa	South	II	Eleno M. Andales Jr.	23,708	22,658	+4.63%	1.277	17,744	072217062	Urban
Quiot Pardo	South	II	Danilo P. Teves	29,085	27,984	+3.93%	0.7614	36,755	072217063	Urban
Sambag I	North	I	Maria Ailien R. Guardo	12,365	11,526	+7.28%	0.5163	22,326	072217064	Urban
Sambag II	North	I	Keith Noel T. Wenceslao	12,534	12,173	+2.97%	0.4474	27,207	072217065	Urban
San Antonio	North	I	Daido Stephen D. Abcede Jr.	2,567	2,060	+24.61%	0.1283	16,051	072217066	Urban
San Jose	North	I	Edgardo C. Borces	7,412	8,027	−7.66%	2.869	2,797	072217067	Urban
San Nicolas Proper	South	II	Clifford Jude G. Niñal	3,790	5,327	−28.85%	0.2810	18,957	072217068	Urban
San Roque	North	I	Virginia N. Abenoja	4,079	3,617	+12.77%	0.4550	7,949	072217069	Urban
Santa Cruz	North	I	Jerome B. Lim	3,183	2,105	+51.21%	0.2291	9,190	072217070	Urban
Santo Niño (Poblacion)	North	I	Lourdes R. Ramirez	677	781	−13.32%	0.2952	2,646	072217022	Urban
Sapangdaku	South	II	Jovito S. Ladrazo	8,809	8,214	+7.24%	8.394	978.6	072217077	Urban
Sawang Calero	South	II	Sergio S. Ocaña	7,895	7,676	+2.85%	0.2427	31,628	072217071	Urban
Sinsin	South	II	Aurelio R. Laspoña	2,854	2,578	+10.71%	8.122	317.4	072217073	Rural
Sirao	North	I	Felix V. Limotan	3,509	3,647	−3.78%	7.705	473.4	072217074	Rural
Suba	South	II	Jemcerson T. Sable	10,745	10,606	+1.31%	0.09669	109,691	072217075	Urban
Sudlon I	South	II	Mark Jason Tabucal	3,292	3,273	+0.58%	3.206	1,021	072217076	Rural
Sudlon II	South	II	Winefredo A. Macario	4,615	4,229	+9.13%	16.12	262.4	072217088	Rural
T. Padilla	North	I	Irene C. Nadal	6,831	6,719	+1.67%	0.1651	40,694	072217078	Urban
Tabunan	South	II	Lucresia D. Gabato	2,360	2,270	+3.96%	15.86	143.1	072217079	Rural
Tagba-o	South	II	Ana C. Tabal	1,809	1,744	+3.73%	10.53	165.6	072217080	Rural
Talamban	North	I	Dario B. Arcilla	28,918	33,382	−13.37%	4.630	7,210	072217081	Urban
Taptap	North	I	Brian M. Bontuyan	2,559	2,484	+3.02%	7.570	328.1	072217082	Rural
Tejero (Villa Gonzalo)	North	I	Harold S. Seno	11,268	14,084	−19.99%	0.5384	26,158	072217083	Urban
Tinago	North	I	Dennis S. Arciaga	4,289	6,700	−35.99%	0.2298	29,156	072217084	Urban
Tisa	South	II	Bernardo L. Lapiña Jr.	46,812	47,364	−1.17%	2.436	19,443	072217085	Urban
To-ong	South	II	Alejandro D. Borres	5,060	4,549	+11.23%	6.815	667.5	072217086	Rural
Zapatera	North	I	David M. Agravante	3,165	2,957	+7.03%	0.3356	8,811	072217084	Urban
Cebu City				965,332	964,169					
Source: Philippine Statistics Authority - Philippine Standard Geographic Code - Cebu City - Barangays

== Liga ng mga Barangay-Cebu City Chapter ==
The Liga ng mga Barangay-Cebu City Chapter is a formal organization of all the barangays in Cebu City with its mother organization which is the Liga ng mga Barangay sa Pilipinas. All of the city's 80 barangays are part of the said organization. The President of the LNB-Cebu City Chapter is an ex-officio member of the Sangguniang Panglungsod.

Here are the current officers of LNB-Cebu City Chapter:

Position	Official	Barangay
President	Franklyn O. Ong	Kasambagan
Vice President	Carlitos E. Ceniza	Kalunasan
Auditor	Daido Stephen D. Abcede Jr.	San Antonio
Board of Directors	Rex Y. Millan	Kalubihan
Board of Directors	Danilo C. Lim	Poblacion Pardo
Board of Directors	Gremar C. Barete	Buhisan
Board of Directors	Reynald A. Lauron	Cambinocot
Board of Directors	Susan B. Enriquez	Kinasang-an Pardo
Board of Directors	Apol Ross G. Enriquez	Guadalupe
Board of Directors	Nerissa G. Antolihao	Budlaan
Board of Directors	Nilo C. Tariman	Pit-os

=== Changes and disputes ===
==== Barangay Duljo Fatima ====
Ricardo "Joel" Ycong defeated incumbent councilor Juliet Abella, wife of the outgoing barangay captain Elmer Abella who was running for barangay councilor, for the post of barangay captain of Duljo Fatima in the 2018 barangay elections. Three days after his proclamation, Ycong succumbed to heart attack.

Following the rule of succession, the first-ranked councilor who happened to be outgoing barangay captain and newly-elected barangay councilor Abella became the new barangay captain.

==== Barangay Ermita ====
On July 19, 2018, barangay captain Mark Rizaldy Miral of Ermita together with his six barangay councilors namely Antonieto Flores, Ryan Jay Rosas, Alio Tamundo, Domingo Ando, Maria Buanghug, and Wilbert Flores were suspended for one year by the Office of the Ombudsman. The said officials were held liable for grave neglect of duty for refusing to assist the Philippine Drug Enforcement Agency in their operation on November 6, 2016.

As a result, barangay councilor Efe Rupinta took over as acting barangay captain until Miral and the rest of the barangay councilors were reinstated on July 22, 2019.

==== Barangay Mabolo ====
As first-ranked barangay councilor, Frank Gajudo assumed the position of barangay captain of Mabolo on noon of June 30, 2019, after the office holder Prisca Niña Mabatid ran and won as Cebu City councilor in the 2019 elections.

==== Barangay Mambaling ====
Barangay captain Gines Abellana was suspended by the Cebu City Council on January 9, 2019, for not releasing the honorarium of four barangay councilors since July to December 2018. The first-ranked councilor Anne Marie Palomo assumed the position as acting barangay captain on January 10, 2019, after taking oath to then Mayor Tomas Osmeña but Abellana refused to step down pending an opinion from the Department of the Interior and Local Government (DILG). On September 30, 2019, Cebu City Legal Officer Rey Gealon informed members of the Cebu City Council that Abellana can reassume his post after getting a favorable opinion from DILG.

==== Barangay Poblacion Pardo ====
On June 7, 2020, barangay captain Manolita Abarquez died due to complications from pneumonia. She was succeeded by the first-ranked barangay councilor Archie Araw–Araw.

==== Barangay San Roque ====
As first-ranked barangay councilor, Virginia Abenoja assumed the position of barangay captain of San Roque after the office holder Rogelio Ruizo died on November 7, 2019.

==== Barangay Tisa ====
As first-ranked barangay councilor, Renato "Ringo" Pacaña assumed the position of barangay captain of Tisa on noon of June 30, 2019, after the office holder Phillip Zafra ran and won as Cebu City councilor in the 2019 elections.

==== Barangay Zapatera ====
Francisco Benedicto, barangay captain of Zapatera, was suspended for 2 months by the Cebu City Council on December 18, 2019, in view of the sexual harassment and graft and corruption complaints filed against him. Juan Flores, the first-ranked barangay councilor, temporarily assumed his position.

== Formally proposed/renamed barangays ==
=== Proposed barangay with enacted law ===
==== Rejected in a plebiscite ====
- Banawa-Englis (2010) – The act dividing Barangay Guadalupe into two, Republic Act No. 9905, was approved on January 7, 2010. Banawa-Englilsh was to be composed of the puroks in Sitio Banawa and Sitio English. The COMELEC originally scheduled the plebiscite on March 13, 2010, but was delayed because of court petition from then Labangon barangay councilman Victor Buendia to withhold the plebiscite. A new date of the plebiscite was set and on July 28, 2012, majority of the votes cast rejected the division.

=== Proposed rename barangay ===
- Buot-Taup to Pedro Calungsod (2000–2011) – Then barangay captain Rosalina Callino lobbied to the Cebu City Council the renaming of Barangay Buot-Taup to Pedro Calungsod, who was beatified March 5, 2000, after their barangay council adopted a resolution changing the barangay's name due to the negative connotation of the word "taup" which means "deeply rooted" in Cebuano.
- Buot-Taup to Buot (2011) – The barangay, in a new resolution, proposed to drop the word "taup" from Barangay Buot-Taup. The Cebu City Council referred it to the Culture and Historical Affairs Commission (CHAC) for their comments and recommendations.
