= 2025 Philippine local elections in Central Visayas =

- May 12, 2025
- Gubernatorial elections
- 2 provincial governors and 3 city mayors
Party	Seats	+/–
Lakas	2	+2
Liberal	1	+1
PDP–Laban	1	−2
PFP	1	New
This lists parties that won seats. See the complete results below.
- Vice gubernatorial elections
- 2 provincial vice governors and 3 city vice mayors
Party	Seats	+/–
1CEBU	2	+2
Liberal	1	0
Nacionalista	1	0
PFP	1	New
This lists parties that won seats. See the complete results below.
- Provincial Board elections
- 26 provincial board members and 40 city councilors
Party	Seats	+/–
1CEBU	17	+13
Lakas	16	+15
PFP	16	+16
Liberal	7	+5
Nacionalista	6	0
Aksyon	1	−1
Partido Barug	1	New
NUP	1	−4
RP	1	New
This lists parties that won seats. See the complete results below.

The 2025 Philippine local elections in Central Visayas were held on May 12, 2025.

== Summary ==
=== Governors ===
Province/city	Incumbent	Incumbent's party	Winner	Winner's party	Winning margin
Bohol	Aris Aumentado	PFP	Aris Aumentado	PFP	55.23%
Cebu	Gwendolyn Garcia	One Cebu	Pam Baricuatro	PDP–Laban	17.98%
Cebu City (HUC)	Raymond Alvin Garcia	PFP	Nestor Archival	Liberal	13.56%
Lapu-Lapu City (HUC)	Junard Chan	PFP	Cindi Chan	Lakas	44.37%
Mandaue (HUC)	Glenn Bercede	One Cebu	Jonkie Ouano	Lakas	3.56%

=== Vice governors ===
Province/city	Incumbent	Incumbent's party	Winner	Winner's party	Winning margin
Bohol	Tita Baja	Nacionalista	Nick Besas	Nacionalista	41.42%
Cebu	Hilario Davide III	Independent	Glenn Soco	One Cebu	44.92%
Cebu City (HUC)	Dondon Hontiveros	Partido Barug	Tomas Osmeña	Liberal	7.57%
Lapu-Lapu City (HUC)	Celsi Sitoy	PFP	Celsi Sitoy	PFP	42.02%
Mandaue (HUC)	Nerissa Soon-Ruiz	Lakas	Glenn Bercede	One Cebu	3.12%

=== Provincial boards ===
Province/city	Seats	Party control		Composition
Province/city	Seats	Previous	Result	Composition
Bohol	10 elected 3 ex-officio	No majority	No majority	PFP (4); Nacionalista (4); NUP (1); Reform PH (1)
Cebu	16 elected 3 ex-officio	No majority	One Cebu	One Cebu (12); Nacionalista (2); Lakas (2)
Cebu City (HUC)	16 elected 2 ex-officio	No majority	No majority	Liberal (6); PFP (5); Lakas (3); Aksyon (1); Partido Barug (1)
Lapu-Lapu City (HUC)	12 elected 2 ex-officio	PDP–Laban	No majority	PFP (7); Lakas (5)
Mandaue (HUC)	12 elected 2 ex-officio	PDP–Laban	No majority	Lakas (6); One Cebu (5); Liberal (1)

== Bohol ==
=== Governor ===
Incumbent Governor Aris Aumentado of the Partido Federal ng Pilipinas ran for a full term. He was previously affiliated with the Nationalist People's Coalition.

Elected in 2022, Aumentado was suspended by the Office of the Ombudsman on May 28, 2024, for the illegal construction of a resort at the Chocolate Hills. On July 31, 2024, the Office of the Ombudsman reinstated Aumentado.

Aumentado won the election against former Tagbilaran mayor Dan Lim (Independent) and Hardy Leopando (Workers' and Peasants' Party).

Candidate	Party	Votes	%
Aris Aumentado (incumbent)	Partido Federal ng Pilipinas	563,746	75.94
Dan Lim	Independent	153,748	20.71
Hardy Leopando	Workers' and Peasants' Party	24,852	3.35
Total		742,346	100.00
Valid votes		742,346	86.10
Invalid/blank votes		119,885	13.90
Total votes		862,231	100.00
Registered voters/turnout		981,564	87.84
PFP hold			
Source: Commission on Elections

=== Vice Governor ===
Incumbent vice governor Tita Baja of the Nacionalista Party ran for the Bohol Provincial Board in the 3rd provincial district. She became vice governor on July 31, 2024, after Dionisio Victor Balite died.

The Nacionalista Party nominated Bohol Philippine Councilors League president Nick Besas, who won the election against former provincial board member Gerardo Garcia (Liberal Party) and Santos Abella (Independent).

Candidate	Party	Votes	%
Nick Besas	Nacionalista Party	420,658	65.91
Gerardo Garcia	Liberal Party	156,299	24.49
Santos Abella	Independent	61,288	9.60
Total		638,245	100.00
Valid votes		638,245	74.02
Invalid/blank votes		223,986	25.98
Total votes		862,231	100.00
Registered voters/turnout		981,564	87.84
Nacionalista hold			
Source: Commission on Elections

=== Provincial Board ===
The Bohol Provincial Board is composed of 13 board members, 10 of whom are elected.

The Partido Federal ng Pilipinas tied with the Nacionalista Party at four seats each.

Party	Votes	%	Seats	+/–
Partido Federal ng Pilipinas	605,484	30.99	4	New
Nacionalista Party	564,553	28.90	4	+2
Nationalist People's Coalition	215,624	11.04	0	–2
National Unity Party	187,753	9.61	1	–1
Reform PH Party	118,124	6.05	1	New
Laban ng Demokratikong Pilipino	117,349	6.01	0	New
Akbayan	67,287	3.44	0	New
Democratic Party of the Philippines	4,480	0.23	0	New
Independent	72,993	3.74	0	0
Total	1,953,647	100.00	10	0
Total votes	862,231	–		
Registered voters/turnout	981,564	87.84		
Source: Commission on Elections

==== 1st district ====
Bohol's 1st provincial district consists of the same area as Bohol's 1st legislative district. Three board members are elected from this provincial district.

Eight candidates were included in the ballot.

Candidate	Party	Votes	%
Lucille Lagunay (incumbent)	Partido Federal ng Pilipinas	118,275	18.67
Mutya Tirol	Reform PH Party	118,124	18.64
Benjie Arcamo (incumbent)	National Unity Party	95,855	15.13
Aldner Damalerio (incumbent)	National Unity Party	91,898	14.50
Goldie Herrera	Partido Federal ng Pilipinas	88,030	13.89
Jonas Cacho	Laban ng Demokratikong Pilipino	66,419	10.48
Willy Ramasola	Independent	50,487	7.97
Rey Loquere	Democratic Party of the Philippines	4,480	0.71
Total		633,568	100.00
Total votes		290,941	–
Registered voters/turnout		327,862	88.74
Source: Commission on Elections

==== 2nd district ====
Bohol's 2nd provincial district consists of the same area as Bohol's 2nd legislative district. Three board members are elected from this provincial district.

Five candidates were included in the ballot.

Candidate	Party	Votes	%
Jamie Aumentado Villamor (incumbent)	Partido Federal ng Pilipinas	153,122	28.42
Tommy Abapo (incumbent)	Partido Federal ng Pilipinas	127,350	23.63
Eping Estavilla	Partido Federal ng Pilipinas	118,707	22.03
Mimi Boniel (incumbent)	Nationalist People's Coalition	72,380	13.43
Frans Garcia	Akbayan	67,287	12.49
Total		538,846	100.00
Total votes		285,305	–
Registered voters/turnout		326,937	87.27
Source: Commission on Election

==== 3rd district ====
Bohol's 3rd provincial district consists of the same area as Bohol's 3rd legislative district. Four board members are elected from this provincial district.

Nine candidates were included in the ballot.

Candidate	Party	Votes	%
Tita Baja	Nacionalista Party	167,099	21.39
DJ Balite	Nacionalista Party	152,854	19.57
Greg Jala (incumbent)	Nacionalista Party	130,729	16.73
Nathaniel Binlod (incumbent)	Nacionalista Party	113,871	14.58
Dominic Villafuerte	Nationalist People's Coalition	58,724	7.52
Along Olandria	Laban ng Demokratikong Pilipino	50,930	6.52
Elpidio Bonita (incumbent)	Nationalist People's Coalition	48,971	6.27
Rene Espinosa	Nationalist People's Coalition	35,549	4.55
Lilit Toribio Abundo	Independent	22,506	2.88
Total		781,233	100.00
Total votes		285,985	–
Registered voters/turnout		326,765	87.52
Source: Commission on Elections

== Cebu ==
=== Governor ===
Incumbent Governor Gwendolyn Garcia of One Cebu ran for a full term.

Re-elected for a second term in 2022, Garcia was suspended by the Office of the Ombudsman on April 28, 2025, for issuing a construction permit to a private firm without securing clearance from the Department of Environment and Natural Resources.

Garcia was defeated by Pam Baricuatro of the PDP–Laban. Valeriano Gingco (Independent) also ran for governor.

Candidate	Party	Votes	%
Pam Baricuatro	PDP–Laban	1,107,924	58.11
Gwendolyn Garcia (incumbent)	One Cebu	765,051	40.13
Valeriano Gingco	Independent	33,563	1.76
Total		1,906,538	100.00
Valid votes		1,906,538	91.28
Invalid/blank votes		182,211	8.72
Total votes		2,088,749	100.00
Registered voters/turnout		2,409,023	86.71
PDP–Laban gain from 1CEBU			
Source: Commission on Elections

=== Vice Governor ===
Incumbent vice governor Hilario Davide III is running for the House of Representatives in Cebu's 2nd legislative district as an independent. He was previously affiliated with the Liberal Party.

Provincial board member Glenn Soco of One Cebu won the election against former Department of the Interior and Local Government undersecretary Joselito Ruiz (Independent).

Candidate	Party	Votes	%
Glenn Soco	One Cebu	1,090,199	72.46
Joselito Ruiz	Independent	414,403	27.54
Total		1,504,602	100.00
Valid votes		1,504,602	72.03
Invalid/blank votes		584,147	27.97
Total votes		2,088,749	100.00
Registered voters/turnout		2,409,023	86.71
1CEBU gain from Independent			
Source: Commission on Elections

=== Provincial Board ===
Following a Supreme Court ruling in 2023 on provincial board representation for component cities having their own legislative districts, the Cebu Provincial Board is composed of 19 board members, 16 of whom are elected.

One Cebu won 12 seats, gaining a majority in the provincial board.

Party	Votes	%	Seats	+/–
One Cebu	1,411,873	59.02	12	+8
Nacionalista Party	349,055	14.59	2	0
Lakas–CMD	243,636	10.19	2	New
Barug Alang sa Kauswagan ug Demokrasya	159,001	6.65	0	0
National Unity Party	60,262	2.52	0	–3
Partido Federal ng Pilipinas	19,559	0.82	0	New
Independent	148,637	6.21	0	–2
Total	2,392,023	100.00	16	+2
Total votes	2,088,749	–		
Registered voters/turnout	2,409,023	86.71		
Source: Commission on Elections

==== 1st district ====
Cebu's 1st provincial district consists of the same area as Cebu's 1st legislative district. Two board members are elected from this provincial district.

Two candidates were included in the ballot.

Candidate	Party	Votes	%
Jojo Bacaltos	Nacionalista Party	209,375	59.98
Lakambini Reluya	Nacionalista Party	139,680	40.02
Total		349,055	100.00
Total votes		427,954	–
Registered voters/turnout		495,807	86.31
Source: Commission on Elections

==== 2nd district ====
Cebu's 2nd provincial district consists of the same area as Cebu's 2nd legislative district. Two board members are elected from this provincial district.

Three candidates were included in the ballot.

Candidate	Party	Votes	%
Stanley Caminero (incumbent)	One Cebu	92,958	44.10
Raymond Calderon (incumbent)	One Cebu	66,252	31.43
Ody Camarillo	Independent	51,580	24.47
Total		210,790	100.00
Total votes		162,413	–
Registered voters/turnout		181,873	89.30
Source: Commission on Elections

==== 3rd district ====
Cebu's 3rd provincial district consists of the same area as Cebu's 3rd legislative district. Two board members are elected from this provincial district.

Four candidates were included in the ballot.

On March 24, 2025, Jiembo Borgonia (One Cebu) withdrew his candidacy, citing problems with party support and logistics.

Candidate	Party	Votes	%
Oloy Corominas	One Cebu	127,330	35.52
Jiembo Borgonia (incumbent, withdrew)	One Cebu	123,803	34.54
Lorenz Lagon	Lakas–CMD	87,737	24.48
Farid Baena	Partido Federal ng Pilipinas	19,559	5.46
Total		358,429	100.00
Total votes		339,394	–
Registered voters/turnout		397,831	85.31
Source: Commission on Elections

==== 4th district ====
Cebu's 4th provincial district consists of the same area as Cebu's 4th legislative district. Two board members are elected from this provincial district.

Four candidates were included in the ballot.

Candidate	Party	Votes	%
Kerrie Shimura (incumbent)	One Cebu	164,718	42.80
Nelson Mondigo	One Cebu	94,032	24.44
Icky Salazar	Independent	65,807	17.10
Jenny Armamento	National Unity Party	60,262	15.66
Total		384,819	100.00
Total votes		308,899	–
Registered voters/turnout		355,168	86.97
Source: Commission on Elections

==== 5th district ====
Cebu's 5th provincial district consists of the same area as Cebu's 5th legislative district. Two board members are elected from this provincial district.

Four candidates were included in the ballot.

Candidate	Party	Votes	%
Red Duterte (incumbent)	One Cebu	200,271	38.82
Mike Villamor (incumbent)	One Cebu	156,605	30.36
Binky Durano Sybico	Barug Alang sa Kauswagan ug Demokrasya	89,485	17.35
Adi Pilones	Barug Alang sa Kauswagan ug Demokrasya	69,516	13.48
Total		515,877	100.00
Total votes		365,634	–
Registered voters/turnout		419,986	87.06
Source: Commission on Elections

==== 6th district ====
Cebu's 6th provincial district consists of the same area as Cebu's 6th legislative district. The city of Mandaue used to be under this provincial district until a Supreme Court ruling in 2023 created a separate provincial district for the city. Two board members are elected from this provincial district.

Two candidates were included in the ballot.

Candidate	Party	Votes	%
Larenz Lagon	One Cebu	87,744	60.21
Alfie Ouano	Lakas–CMD	57,978	39.79
Total		145,722	100.00
Total votes		127,764	–
Registered voters/turnout		153,450	83.26
Source: Commission on Elections

==== 7th district ====
Cebu's 7th district consists of the same area as Cebu's 7th legislative district. Two board members are elected from this provincial district.

Three candidates were included in the ballot.

Candidate	Party	Votes	%
Sarsi Baricuatro (incumbent)	One Cebu	66,367	45.03
Lingling Rozgoni	One Cebu	65,411	44.38
Lorenz Lorono	Independent	15,602	10.59
Total		147,380	100.00
Total votes		149,093	–
Registered voters/turnout		168,055	88.72
Source: Commission on Elections

==== Mandaue ====
Following a Supreme Court ruling in 2023, a provincial district was created for the city of Mandaue, which used to be under the 6th provincial district. Two board members are elected from this provincial district.

Four candidates were included in the ballot.

Candidate	Party	Votes	%
Malcolm Sanchez	One Cebu	107,453	38.38
Olin Seno	Lakas–CMD	97,921	34.98
JJ Go	One Cebu	58,929	21.05
Wilmer Zanoria	Independent	15,648	5.59
Total		279,951	100.00
Total votes		207,598	–
Registered voters/turnout		236,853	87.65
Source: Commission on Elections

== Cebu City ==
=== Mayor ===
Incumbent Mayor Raymond Alvin Garcia of the Partido Federal ng Pilipinas ran for a full term. Garcia became mayor on October 3, 2024, after Office of the Ombudsman dismissed Mike Rama for nepotism in hiring city employees.

Garcia was defeated by city councilor Nestor Archival of the Liberal Party. Former Cebu City mayor Mike Rama (Partido Barug), former Bureau of Customs commissioner Yogi Ruiz (Kilusang Bagong Lipunan), and Julieto Co (Independent) also ran for mayor.

Mike Rama's dismissal as mayor by the Office of the Ombudsman disqualified him from the election. However, the Supreme Court ordered on October 22, 2024, for the Commission on Elections to put Rama's disqualification on hold.

Candidate	Party	Votes	%
Nestor Archival	Liberal Party	256,197	43.86
Raymond Alvin Garcia (incumbent)	Partido Federal ng Pilipinas	176,967	30.30
Mike Rama	Partido Barug	120,124	20.57
Yogi Ruiz	Kilusang Bagong Lipunan	27,652	4.73
Julieto Co	Independent	3,163	0.54
Total		584,103	100.00
Valid votes		584,103	95.79
Invalid/blank votes		25,686	4.21
Total votes		609,789	100.00
Registered voters/turnout		721,469	84.52
Liberal gain from PFP			
Source: Commission on Elections

=== Vice Mayor ===
Incumbent vice mayor Dondon Hontiveros of Partido Barug ran for a full term. Hontiveros became vice mayor on October 10, 2024, after Raymond Alvin Garcia became mayor upon Mike Rama's dismissal.

Hontiveros was defeated by former Cebu City mayor Tomas Osmeña of the Liberal Party. Former Metro Cebu Water District chairman Joey Daluz (Partido Federal ng Pilipinas) also ran for vice mayor.

Candidate	Party	Votes	%
Tomas Osmeña	Liberal Party	233,906	40.90
Dondon Hontiveros (incumbent)	Partido Barug	190,586	33.33
Joey Daluz	Partido Federal ng Pilipinas	147,343	25.77
Total		571,835	100.00
Valid votes		571,835	93.78
Invalid/blank votes		37,954	6.22
Total votes		609,789	100.00
Registered voters/turnout		721,469	84.52
Liberal gain from Barug			
Source: Commission on Elections

=== City Council ===
The Cebu City Council consists of 18 councilors, 16 of whom are elected.

The Liberal Party won six seats, becoming the largest party in the city council.

Party	Votes	%	Seats	+/–
Liberal Party	1,183,618	31.16	6	New
Partido Federal ng Pilipinas	1,148,852	30.24	5	New
Lakas–CMD	742,458	19.55	3	New
Aksyon Demokratiko	194,039	5.11	1	+1
Partido Barug	126,835	3.34	1	New
Akbayan	82,428	2.17	0	New
People's Reform Party	80,772	2.13	0	New
Kilusang Bagong Lipunan	72,276	1.90	0	New
Laban ng Demokratikong Pilipino	22,001	0.58	0	–4
Independent	145,431	3.83	0	–3
Total	3,798,710	100.00	16	0
Total votes	609,789	–		
Registered voters/turnout	721,469	84.52		
Source: Commission on Elections

==== 1st district ====
Cebu City's 1st councilor district consists of the same area as Cebu City's 1st legislative district. Eight councilors are elected from this councilor district.

31 candidates were included in the ballot.

Candidate	Party	Votes	%
Winston Pepito	Partido Federal ng Pilipinas	113,179	6.76
Nice Archival	Liberal Party	105,542	6.31
Harold Kendrick Go	Partido Federal ng Pilipinas	98,052	5.86
Edgardo Labella (incumbent)	Partido Federal ng Pilipinas	96,972	5.79
Joel Garganera (incumbent)	Partido Federal ng Pilipinas	94,194	5.63
Alvin Arcilla	Liberal Party	93,156	5.57
Jun Alcover (incumbent)	Partido Federal ng Pilipinas	84,570	5.05
Bebs Andales	Liberal Party	83,670	5.00
Alvin Dizon	Akbayan	82,428	4.93
Boy Labella	Liberal Party	82,101	4.91
Niña Mabatid	Aksyon Demokratiko	66,465	3.97
RJ Osmeña	Partido Federal ng Pilipinas	63,780	3.81
Ailien Guardo	Partido Federal ng Pilipinas	63,576	3.80
Noel Wenceslao (incumbent)	Lakas–CMD	63,066	3.77
Glena Bontuyan	Partido Federal ng Pilipinas	60,413	3.61
Mac Gordon	Liberal Party	54,444	3.25
Mat Eric Medalle	Liberal Party	51,022	3.05
Jijing Candungog	Liberal Party	47,181	2.82
Ernesto Herrera II	Partido Federal ng Pilipinas	39,577	2.36
Rey Lauron	Lakas–CMD	37,605	2.25
Maria Buanghug	Partido Barug	31,988	1.91
Jessica Resch	Lakas–CMD	31,437	1.88
Titing Biton	Lakas–CMD	23,745	1.42
Edgar Aballe	People's Reform Party	23,149	1.38
Mae Anne Aguipo	Lakas–CMD	22,371	1.34
Rex Millan	Laban ng Demokratikong Pilipino	22,001	1.31
Ren Ranche	Independent	9,294	0.56
Lary Otadoy	Kilusang Bagong Lipunan	8,882	0.53
Mike Ralota	Independent	8,688	0.52
Niceforo Iroy	Kilusang Bagong Lipunan	5,710	0.34
Gyle Ombajin	Independent	5,233	0.31
Total		1,673,491	100.00
Total votes		268,406	–
Registered voters/turnout		326,007	82.33
Source: Commission on Elections

==== 2nd district ====
Cebu City's 2nd councilor district consists of the same area as Cebu City's 2nd legislative district. Eight councilors are elected from this councilor district.

38 candidates were included in the ballot.

Candidate	Party	Votes	%
Dave Tumulak	Aksyon Demokratiko	127,574	6.00
Phillip Zafra (incumbent)	Lakas–CMD	108,520	5.11
Paul Labra	Liberal Party	107,270	5.05
Jose Abellanosa (incumbent)	Liberal Party	101,088	4.76
Mikel Rama	Partido Barug	94,847	4.46
Francis Esparis (incumbent)	Lakas–CMD	93,500	4.40
Michelle Abella	Liberal Party	90,061	4.24
Harry Eran	Lakas–CMD	90,048	4.24
Joy Pesquera (incumbent)	Lakas–CMD	89,177	4.20
Jungabs Gabuya	Liberal Party	89,048	4.19
Rey Gealon (incumbent)	Partido Federal ng Pilipinas	81,565	3.84
Ian Osmeña	Liberal Party	79,544	3.74
Bobcab Cabarrubias	Liberal Party	75,279	3.54
Pie Abella	Partido Federal ng Pilipinas	73,952	3.48
Eugene Labella	Partido Federal ng Pilipinas	73,428	3.46
Gremar Barete	Lakas–CMD	70,073	3.30
Raf Alcoseba	Liberal Party	69,744	3.28
Nobie Abella-Cabatino	Lakas–CMD	61,304	2.88
Renato Osmeña (incumbent)	Partido Federal ng Pilipinas	60,770	2.86
Yvonne Cania	People's Reform Party	57,623	2.71
James Cuenco (incumbent)	Partido Federal ng Pilipinas	56,695	2.67
Boyet Ocampo	Liberal Party	54,468	2.56
Vic Buendia	Independent	52,595	2.47
Ramon Alcoseba	Lakas–CMD	51,612	2.43
Jeson Guardo	Partido Federal ng Pilipinas	45,208	2.13
Opel Abellanosa	Partido Federal ng Pilipinas	42,921	2.02
Jerone Castillo	Independent	23,518	1.11
Bonel Balingit	Kilusang Bagong Lipunan	21,594	1.02
Win-Win Abellana	Independent	12,868	0.61
Omar Kintanar	Kilusang Bagong Lipunan	11,547	0.54
Susan Jaca Berido	Independent	9,677	0.46
Emman Maranga	Kilusang Bagong Lipunan	9,438	0.44
Ali Cabido	Independent	8,611	0.41
Arlene Salahuddin	Kilusang Bagong Lipunan	7,931	0.37
Renil Oliva	Kilusang Bagong Lipunan	7,174	0.34
Rom Regala Gutobat	Independent	5,386	0.25
Abdon Verdida Jr.	Independent	4,980	0.23
Aldem Tello	Independent	4,581	0.22
Total		2,125,219	100.00
Total votes		341,383	–
Registered voters/turnout		395,462	86.33
Source: Commission on Elections

== Lapu-Lapu City ==
=== Mayor ===
Incumbent Mayor Junard Chan of the Partido Federal ng Pilipinas ran for the House of Representatives in Lapu-Lapu's lone legislative district. He was previously affiliated with PDP–Laban.

Chan endorsed his wife, representative Cynthia Chan (Lakas–CMD), who won the election against former representative Paz Radaza (PDP–Laban) and Cristine Takahashi (Kilusang Bagong Lipunan).

Candidate	Party	Votes	%
Cynthia Chan	Lakas–CMD	142,058	63.47
Paz Radaza	PDP–Laban	42,757	19.10
Cristine Takahashi	Kilusang Bagong Lipunan	39,010	17.43
Total		223,825	100.00
Valid votes		223,825	94.71
Invalid/blank votes		12,492	5.29
Total votes		236,317	100.00
Registered voters/turnout		277,288	85.22
Lakas gain from PFP			
Source: Commission on Elections

=== Vice Mayor ===
Incumbent vice mayor Celsi Sitoy of the Partido Federal ng Pilipinas ran for a third term. He was previously affiliated with PDP–Laban.

Sitoy won the election against Myk Dignos (PDP–Laban).

Candidate	Party	Votes	%
Celsi Sitoy (incumbent)	Partido Federal ng Pilipinas	145,995	71.01
Myk Dignos	PDP–Laban	59,591	28.99
Total		205,586	100.00
Valid votes		205,586	87.00
Invalid/blank votes		30,731	13.00
Total votes		236,317	100.00
Registered voters/turnout		277,288	85.22
PFP hold			
Source: Commission on Elections

=== City Council ===
The Lapu-Lapu City Council is composed of 14 councilors, 12 of whom are elected.

30 candidates were included in the ballot.

The Partido Federal ng Pilipinas won seven seats, becoming the largest party in the city council.

Party	Votes	%	Seats	+/–
Partido Federal ng Pilipinas	729,462	36.90	7	New
PDP–Laban	632,679	32.01	0	–12
Lakas–CMD	538,609	27.25	5	+5
Independent	75,973	3.84	0	0
Total	1,976,723	100.00	12	0
Total votes	236,317	–		
Registered voters/turnout	277,288	85.22		
Source: Commission on Elections

Candidate	Party	Votes	%
Jun Alforque (incumbent)	Lakas–CMD	115,670	5.85
Abeth Cuizon (incumbent)	Partido Federal ng Pilipinas	115,431	5.84
Susan Baring (incumbent)	Lakas–CMD	114,562	5.80
Tino Aying (incumbent)	Partido Federal ng Pilipinas	113,205	5.73
Janvi dela Serna (incumbent)	Lakas–CMD	108,247	5.48
Efren Herrera (incumbent)	Partido Federal ng Pilipinas	107,287	5.43
Ariane Yap	Lakas–CMD	103,725	5.25
Rufo Bering	Partido Federal ng Pilipinas	102,725	5.20
Montor Tatoy (incumbent)	Partido Federal ng Pilipinas	100,799	5.10
Jeorgen Eyas-Book (incumbent)	Lakas–CMD	96,405	4.88
Joseph Pangatungan (incumbent)	Partido Federal ng Pilipinas	95,170	4.81
Emilio Galaroza (incumbent)	Partido Federal ng Pilipinas	94,845	4.80
Titing Tumulak	PDP–Laban	64,594	3.27
Rogelio Aying	PDP–Laban	63,295	3.20
Ronnie Berdin	PDP–Laban	62,428	3.16
Boy Patalinjug	PDP–Laban	58,698	2.97
Alan Jay Amodia	PDP–Laban	57,019	2.88
Teddy Ybañez	PDP–Laban	51,087	2.58
Richard Aparri	PDP–Laban	48,117	2.43
Carolina Apa-Acaba	PDP–Laban	47,680	2.41
Gadoy Abejo	PDP–Laban	47,322	2.39
Regina Ybañez	PDP–Laban	47,156	2.39
Loloy Cahilog	PDP–Laban	43,181	2.18
Delano Eviota	PDP–Laban	42,102	2.13
Henry Cañete	Independent	17,418	0.88
Boy Ybalez	Independent	16,258	0.82
Belle Lara	Independent	11,520	0.58
Jose Marvin Barot	Independent	10,937	0.55
Alfredo Verame	Independent	10,461	0.53
Vince Primor	Independent	9,379	0.47
Total		1,976,723	100.00
Total votes		236,317	–
Registered voters/turnout		277,288	85.22
Source: Commission on Elections

== Mandaue ==
=== Mayor ===
Incumbent Mayor Glenn Bercede of One Cebu ran for vice mayor of Mandaue. He became mayor on October 4, 2024, after the Office of the Ombudsman dismissed Jonas Cortes for the illegal operation of a cement batching plant.

One Cebu nominated former Mandaue mayor Jonas Cortes, who was defeated by provincial board member Jonkie Ouano of Lakas–CMD. Two other candidates also ran for mayor.

Cortes' dismissal as mayor by the Office of the Ombudsman disqualified him from the election. However, the Supreme Court ordered on October 22, 2024, for the Commission on Elections (COMELEC) to put Cortes' disqualification on hold.

On December 27, 2024, the COMELEC cancelled Cortes' candidacy for failing to disclose about his dismissal. The Supreme Court temporarily prevented the COMELEC from cancelling Cortes' candidacy on January 20, 2025.

Candidate	Party	Votes	%
Jonkie Ouano	Lakas–CMD	101,549	50.86
Jonas Cortes	One Cebu	94,448	47.30
Jo Cortes	Independent	2,667	1.34
Gepind Requierme	Independent	999	0.50
Total		199,663	100.00
Valid votes		199,663	96.18
Invalid/blank votes		7,935	3.82
Total votes		207,598	100.00
Registered voters/turnout		236,853	87.65
Lakas hold			
Source: Commission on Elections

=== Vice Mayor ===
Incumbent vice mayor Nerissa Soon-Ruiz of Lakas–CMD ran for a full term. She became vice mayor on October 8, 2024, after Glenn Bercede became mayor upon Jonas Cortes' dismissal.

Soon-Ruiz was defeated by Mandaue mayor Glenn Bercede of One Cebu. Jude Aparre (Independent) also ran for mayor.

Candidate	Party	Votes	%
Glenn Bercede	One Cebu	98,160	50.75
Nerissa Soon-Ruiz (incumbent)	Lakas–CMD	92,122	47.63
Jude Aparre	Independent	3,120	1.61
Total		193,402	100.00
Valid votes		193,402	93.16
Invalid/blank votes		14,196	6.84
Total votes		207,598	100.00
Registered voters/turnout		236,853	87.65
1CEBU gain from Lakas			
Source: Commission on Elections

=== City Council ===
The Mandaue City Council is composed of 14 councilors, 12 of whom are elected.

27 candidates were included in the ballot.

Lakas–CMD won six seats, becoming the largest party in the city council.

Party	Votes	%	Seats	+/–
Lakas–CMD	960,477	50.43	6	New
One Cebu	554,846	29.13	5	New
Liberal Party	194,709	10.22	1	New
Aksyon Demokratiko	131,546	6.91	0	New
Independent	63,169	3.32	0	0
Total	1,904,747	100.00	12	0
Total votes	207,598	–		
Registered voters/turnout	236,853	87.65		
Source: Commission on Elections

Candidate	Party	Votes	%
Joel Seno	Lakas–CMD	95,970	5.04
Fritz Villamor	Lakas–CMD	89,490	4.70
Eugene Andaya	Lakas–CMD	86,948	4.56
Ben Basiga	Lakas–CMD	86,303	4.53
Jimmy Lumapas	One Cebu	85,731	4.50
Carlo Fortuna	Liberal Party	85,655	4.50
Maline Cortes-Zafra	One Cebu	85,494	4.49
Jun Arcilla	One Cebu	84,893	4.46
Cesar Cabahug	Lakas–CMD	83,435	4.38
Jen del Mar	One Cebu	82,874	4.35
Anjong Icalina Ouano	Lakas–CMD	80,674	4.24
Raul Kevin Cabahug	One Cebu	77,395	4.06
Greg Yap	Lakas–CMD	76,017	3.99
Copoy Villanueva	Lakas–CMD	75,494	3.96
Bubbles Suson	Lakas–CMD	74,602	3.92
Marco Sanchez	Aksyon Demokratiko	74,353	3.90
Tingy Echavez	Lakas–CMD	72,043	3.78
Eping Diano	Lakas–CMD	70,098	3.68
Oca del Castillo	One Cebu	69,810	3.67
Dar Tarriman	Lakas–CMD	69,403	3.64
Dante Borbajo	One Cebu	68,649	3.60
Ernie Manatad	Liberal Party	61,913	3.25
FK Remedio	Aksyon Demokratiko	57,193	3.00
Jojie Espina	Liberal Party	47,141	2.47
JP Ceniza	Independent	37,925	1.99
Aidan Pepito	Independent	16,891	0.89
Jocel Baluyot	Independent	8,353	0.44
Total		1,904,747	100.00
Total votes		207,598	–
Registered voters/turnout		236,853	87.65
Source: Commission on Elections

== Election-related incidents ==
On April 30, 2025, a campaign coordinator of a municipal candidate was killed in a shooting in Badian, Cebu.
