= 2022 Philippine local elections in Central Visayas =

- May 9, 2022
- Gubernatorial elections
- 4 provincial governors and 3 city mayors
Party	Seats	+/–
PDP–Laban	3	−3
NPC	2	+2
Nacionalista	1	0
1CEBU	1	New
This lists parties that won seats. See the complete results below.
- Vice gubernatorial elections
- 4 provincial vice governors and 3 city vice mayors
Party	Seats	+/–
PDP–Laban	3	+1
NPC	2	0
Liberal	1	−1
Nacionalista	1	New
This lists parties that won seats. See the complete results below.
- Provincial Board elections
- 40 provincial board members and 40 city councilors
Party	Seats	+/–
PDP–Laban	42	+11
NPC	7	−4
Nacionalista	6	+1
NUP	5	+3
LDP	4	−3
1CEBU	4	+3
Aksyon	2	New
Liberal	2	−4
Lakas	1	−9
Independent	7	+3
This lists parties that won seats. See the complete results below.

The 2022 Philippine local elections in Central Visayas were held on May 9, 2022.

== Summary ==
=== Governors ===
Province/city	Incumbent	Incumbent's party	Winner	Winner's party	Winning margin
Bohol	Arthur C. Yap	PDP–Laban	Aris Aumentado	NPC	24.43%
Cebu	Gwendolyn Garcia	One Cebu	Gwendolyn Garcia	One Cebu	62.14%
Cebu City (HUC)	Mike Rama	PDP–Laban	Mike Rama	PDP–Laban	6.34%
Lapu-Lapu City (HUC)	Junard Chan	PDP–Laban	Junard Chan	PDP–Laban	52.86%
Mandaue (HUC)	Jonas Cortes	PDP–Laban	Jonas Cortes	PDP–Laban	11.14%
Negros Oriental	Roel Degamo	Nacionalista	Roel Degamo	Nacionalista	4.48%
Siquijor	Zaldy Villa	PDP–Laban	Jake Vincent Villa	NPC	1.92%

=== Vice governors ===
Province/city	Incumbent	Incumbent's party	Winner	Winner's party	Winning margin
Bohol	Rene Relampagos	NUP	Dionisio Victor Balite	NPC	5.50%
Cebu	Hilario Davide III	Liberal	Hilario Davide III	Liberal	4.59%
Cebu City (HUC)	Dondon Hontiveros	Independent	Raymond Alvin Garcia	PDP–Laban	11.16%
Lapu-Lapu City (HUC)	Celsi Sitoy	PDP–Laban	Celsi Sitoy	PDP–Laban	43.58%
Mandaue (HUC)	Glenn Bercede	PDP–Laban	Glenn Bercede	PDP–Laban	30.23%
Negros Oriental	Guido Reyes	Nacionalista	Guido Reyes	Nacionalista	0.23%
Siquijor	Mimi Quezon-Brown	NPC	Mimi Quezon-Brown	NPC	14.88%

=== Provincial boards ===
Province/city	Seats	Party control		Composition
Province/city	Seats	Previous	Result	Composition
Bohol	10 elected 3 ex-officio	No majority	No majority	PDP–Laban (3); NUP (2); NPC (2); Nacionalista (2); Aksyon (1)
Cebu	14 elected 3 ex-officio	No majority	No majority	One Cebu (4); NUP (3); Nacionalista (2); PDP–Laban (2); NPC (1); Independent (2)
Cebu City (HUC)	16 elected 2 ex-officio	No majority	No majority	PDP–Laban (9); LDP (4); Independent (3)
Lapu-Lapu City (HUC)	12 elected 2 ex-officio	Lakas	PDP–Laban	PDP–Laban (12)
Mandaue (HUC)	12 elected 2 ex-officio	PDP–Laban	PDP–Laban	PDP–Laban (11); Independent (1)
Negros Oriental	10 elected 3 ex-officio	No majority	No majority	NPC (4); Nacionalista (2); Liberal (2); Lakas (1); Independent (1)
Siquijor	6 elected 3 ex-officio	PDP–Laban	PDP–Laban	PDP–Laban (5); Aksyon (1)

== Bohol ==
=== Governor ===
Incumbent Governor Arthur C. Yap of PDP–Laban ran for a second term.

Yap was defeated by representative Aris Aumentado of the Nationalist People's Coalition. Two other candidates also ran for governor.

Candidate	Party	Votes	%
Aris Aumentado	Nationalist People's Coalition	469,736	61.76
Arthur C. Yap (incumbent)	PDP–Laban	283,903	37.33
Hercules Castillo	Independent	4,220	0.55
Concepcion Flores	Independent	2,693	0.35
Total		760,552	100.00
Total votes		837,470	–
Registered voters/turnout		949,791	88.17
NPC gain from PDP–Laban			
Source: Commission on Elections

=== Vice Governor ===
Incumbent Vice Governor Rene Relampagos of the National Unity Party ran for a second term.

Relampagos was defeated by provincial board member Dionisio Victor Balite of the Nationalist People's Coalition.

Candidate	Party	Votes	%
Dionisio Victor Balite	Nationalist People's Coalition	361,722	52.75
Rene Relampagos (incumbent)	National Unity Party	323,998	47.25
Total		685,720	100.00
Total votes		837,470	–
Registered voters/turnout		949,791	88.17
NPC gain from NUP			
Source: Commission on Elections

=== Provincial Board ===
The Bohol Provincial Board is composed of 13 board members, 10 of whom are elected.

PDP–Laban won three seats, becoming the largest party in the provincial board.

Party	Votes	%	Seats	+/–
PDP–Laban	452,666	24.38	3	+1
National Unity Party	437,328	23.56	2	+1
Nationalist People's Coalition	425,534	22.92	2	–2
Nacionalista Party	310,406	16.72	2	+2
Aksyon Demokratiko	83,074	4.47	1	New
People's Reform Party	79,036	4.26	0	New
Partido para sa Demokratikong Reporma	30,114	1.62	0	New
Independent	38,317	2.06	0	–1
Total	1,856,475	100.00	10	0
Total votes	837,470	–		
Registered voters/turnout	949,791	88.17		

==== 1st district ====
Bohol's 1st provincial district consists of the same area as Bohol's 1st legislative district. Three board members are elected from this provincial district.

Eight candidates were included in the ballot.

Candidate	Party	Votes	%
Benjie Arcamo	National Unity Party	108,652	18.90
Lucille Lagunay (incumbent)	Nationalist People's Coalition	102,545	17.84
Aldner Damalerio (incumbent)	National Unity Party	98,667	17.16
Ricky Masamayor (incumbent)	National Unity Party	85,768	14.92
Margaux Herrera-Caya	People's Reform Party	79,036	13.75
Dominic Butalid	Nationalist People's Coalition	65,078	11.32
Joseph Sevilla	Partido para sa Demokratikong Reporma	30,114	5.24
Tiyo Junior Sordilla	Independent	5,014	0.87
Total		574,874	100.00
Total votes		280,232	–
Registered voters/turnout		316,471	88.55
Source: Commission on Elections

==== 2nd district ====
Bohol's 2nd provincial district consists of the same area as Bohol's 2nd legislative district. Three board members are elected from this provincial district.

Eight candidates were included in the ballot.

Candidate	Party	Votes	%
Tommy Abapo	Nationalist People's Coalition	92,173	16.73
Jami Aumentado Villamor	Aksyon Demokratiko	83,074	15.08
Mimi Boniel (incumbent)	PDP–Laban	82,144	14.91
Doc Entero	Nationalist People's Coalition	81,494	14.79
Frans Garcia (incumbent)	National Unity Party	75,156	13.64
Agapito Avenido	National Unity Party	69,085	12.54
Galie Atup	PDP–Laban	60,909	11.06
Santos Abella	Independent	6,905	1.25
Total		550,940	100.00
Total votes		275,219	–
Registered voters/turnout		312,534	88.06
Source: Commission on Elections

==== 3rd district ====
Bohol's 3rd provincial district consists of the same area as Bohol's 3rd legislative district. Four board members are elected from this provincial district.

Nine candidates were included in the ballot.

Candidate	Party	Votes	%
Tita Baja	Nacionalista Party	128,029	17.52
Greg Crispinito Jala	Nacionalista Party	103,607	14.18
Nathaniel Binlod	PDP–Laban	86,314	11.81
Elpidio Bonita (incumbent)	PDP–Laban	85,515	11.70
Arnold Dasio Cagulada	Nationalist People's Coalition	84,244	11.53
Bebot Sumampong	Nacionalista Party	78,770	10.78
Albags Baguio	PDP–Laban	74,967	10.26
EJ Bernido	PDP–Laban	62,817	8.60
Don de la Peña	Independent	26,398	3.61
Total		730,661	100.00
Total votes		282,019	–
Registered voters/turnout		320,786	87.91
Source: Commission on Elections

== Cebu ==
=== Governor ===
Incumbent Governor Gwendolyn Garcia of One Cebu ran for a second term.

Garcia won re-election against former representative Ace Durano (Partido Pilipino sa Pagbabago) and Nito Magnanao (Independent).

Candidate	Party	Votes	%
Gwendolyn Garcia (incumbent)	One Cebu	1,478,436	80.80
Ace Durano	Partido Pilipino sa Pagbabago	341,455	18.66
Nito Magnanao	Independent	9,812	0.54
Total		1,829,703	100.00
Total votes		2,021,310	–
Registered voters/turnout		2,310,339	87.49
1CEBU hold			
Source: Commission on Elections

=== Vice Governor ===
Incumbent Vice Governor Hilario Davide III of the Liberal Party ran for a second term.

Davide won re-election against two other candidates.

Candidate	Party	Votes	%
Hilario Davide III (incumbent)	Liberal Party	788,081	50.60
Tess Heyrosa	One Cebu	716,480	46.01
John Enad	PROMDI	52,784	3.39
Total		1,557,345	100.00
Total votes		2,021,310	–
Registered voters/turnout		2,310,339	87.49
Liberal hold			
Source: Commission on Elections

=== Provincial Board ===
The Cebu Provincial Board is composed of 17 board members, 14 of whom are elected.

One Cebu won four seats, becoming the largest party in the provincial board.

Party	Votes	%	Seats	+/–
One Cebu	541,975	21.95	4	+3
Nacionalista Party	409,013	16.57	2	0
PDP–Laban	361,538	14.64	2	–2
National Unity Party	273,202	11.07	3	+2
PROMDI	211,395	8.56	0	New
Barug Alang sa Kauswagan ug Demokrasya	192,740	7.81	0	–1
Partido Pilipino sa Pagbabago	129,202	5.23	0	New
Nationalist People's Coalition	74,917	3.03	1	–2
Partido para sa Demokratikong Reporma	34,965	1.42	0	New
Independent	240,074	9.72	2	+1
Total	2,469,021	100.00	14	0
Total votes	2,021,310	–		
Registered voters/turnout	2,310,339	87.49		

==== 1st district ====
Cebu's 1st provincial district consists of the same area as Cebu's 1st legislative district. Two board members are elected from this provincial district.

Five candidates were included in the ballot.

Candidate	Party	Votes	%
Yoly Daan (incumbent)	Nacionalista Party	231,416	43.04
Raul Bacaltos (incumbent)	Nacionalista Party	177,597	33.03
Ron del Mar	PROMDI	105,892	19.69
Jerjer Cimafranca	Independent	12,802	2.38
Sim Danatil	Independent	9,997	1.86
Total		537,704	100.00
Total votes		415,606	–
Registered voters/turnout		470,692	88.30
Source: Commission on Elections

==== 2nd district ====
Cebu's 2nd provincial district consists of the same area as Cebu's 2nd legislative district. Two board members are elected from this provincial district.

Five candidates were included in the ballot.

Candidate	Party	Votes	%
Stanley Caminero	Independent	69,158	30.87
Raymond Joseph Calderon	National Unity Party	59,194	26.43
Bobby Tambis	One Cebu	56,381	25.17
Boy Montejo	Partido para sa Demokratikong Reporma	34,965	15.61
Joseph Glenn Verano	Independent	4,307	1.92
Total		224,005	100.00
Total votes		154,257	–
Registered voters/turnout		175,265	88.01
Source: Commission on Elections

==== 3rd district ====
Cebu's 3rd provincial district consists of the same area as Cebu's 3rd legislative district. Two board members are elected from this provincial district.

Three candidates were included in the ballot.

Candidate	Party	Votes	%
Jiembo Borgonia (incumbent)	1-Cebu	132,514	37.43
Tata Corominas (incumbent)	Independent	116,024	32.77
Jeph Yapha	PROMDI	105,503	29.80
Total		354,041	100.00
Total votes		334,385	–
Registered voters/turnout		383,749	87.14
Source: Commission on Elections

==== 4th district ====
Cebu's 4th provincial district consists of the same area as Cebu's 4th legislative district. Two board members are elected from this provincial district.

Four candidates were included in the ballot.

Candidate	Party	Votes	%
Kerrie Shimura (incumbent)	National Unity Party	129,307	37.68
Raci Franco (incumbent)	National Unity Party	84,701	24.68
Nelson Mondigo	Partido Pilipino sa Pagbabago	70,345	20.50
Digoy Mayol	Partido Pilipino sa Pagbabago	58,857	17.15
Total		343,210	100.00
Total votes		303,689	–
Registered voters/turnout		345,099	88.00
Source: Commission on Elections

==== 5th district ====
Cebu's 5th provincial district consists of the same area as Cebu's 5th legislative district. Two board members are elected from this provincial district.

Four candidates were included in the ballot.

Candidate	Party	Votes	%
Red Duterte (incumbent)	One Cebu	156,085	32.21
Mike Villamor	One Cebu	135,769	28.02
Jed Almendras	Barug Alang sa Kauswagan ug Demokrasya	104,768	21.62
Jude Durano Sybico	Barug Alang sa Kauswagan ug Demokrasya	87,972	18.15
Total		484,594	100.00
Total votes		352,260	–
Registered voters/turnout		397,223	88.68
Source: Commission on Elections

==== 6th district ====
Cebu's 6th provincial district consists of the same area as Cebu's 6th legislative district and the city of Mandaue. Two board members are elected from this provincial district.

Two candidates were included in the ballot.

Candidate	Party	Votes	%
Thadeo Ouano (incumbent)	PDP–Laban	183,675	47.18
Glenn Soco (incumbent)	PDP–Laban	177,863	45.69
Gabs Garcia	Independent	27,786	7.14
Total		389,324	100.00
Total votes		316,281	–
Registered voters/turnout		375,216	84.29
Source: Commission on Elections

==== 7th district ====
Cebu's 7th district consists of the same area as Cebu's 7th legislative district. Two board members are elected from this provincial district.

Three candidates were included in the ballot.

Candidate	Party	Votes	%
Jerome Librando (incumbent)	Nationalist People's Coalition	74,917	55.03
Sarsi Baricuatro	One Cebu	61,226	44.97
Total		136,143	100.00
Total votes		144,832	–
Registered voters/turnout		163,095	88.80
Source: Commission on Elections

== Cebu City ==
=== Mayor ===
Incumbent Mayor Mike Rama of PDP–Laban ran for a full term. He became mayor of November 20, 2021, after Edgardo Labella died.

Rama won the election against former city councilor Margot Osmeña (Laban ng Demokratikong Pilipino), city councilor Dave Tumulak (Independent) and three other candidates.

Candidate	Party	Votes	%
Mike Rama (incumbent)	PDP–Laban	239,656	40.85
Margot Osmeña	Laban ng Demokratikong Pilipino	202,446	34.51
Dave Tumulak	Independent	141,225	24.07
Cris Saavedra	Independent	1,418	0.24
Edgar Concha Jr.	Independent	1,133	0.19
Juanito Luna	Independent	760	0.13
Total		586,638	100.00
Total votes		614,453	–
Registered voters/turnout		733,044	83.82
PDP–Laban hold			
Source: Commission on Elections

=== Vice Mayor ===
Incumbent Vice Mayor Dondon Hontiveros ran for the Cebu City Council in the 2nd councilor district as an independent. He became vice mayor on November 20, 2021, after Mike Rama became mayor upon Edgardo Labella's death.

Hontiveros endorsed city councilor Raymond Alvin Garcia (PDP–Laban), who won the election against city councilor Franklyn Ong (Laban ng Demokratikong Pilipino) and former city administrator Bimbo Fernandez (Liberal Party).

Candidate	Party	Votes	%
Raymond Alvin Garcia	PDP–Laban	283,235	52.22
Franklyn Ong	Laban ng Demokratikong Pilipino	222,722	41.06
Bimbo Fernandez	Liberal Party	36,444	6.72
Total		542,401	100.00
Total votes		614,453	–
Registered voters/turnout		733,044	83.82
PDP–Laban gain from Independent			
Source: Commission on Elections

=== City Council ===
The Cebu City Council consists of 18 councilors, 16 of whom are elected.

The PDP–Laban won nine seats, becoming the largest party in the city council.

Party	Votes	%	Seats	+/–
Laban ng Demokratikong Pilipino	1,491,736	38.61	4	–3
PDP–Laban	1,424,626	36.87	9	+1
PROMDI	127,111	3.29	0	New
Partido Panaghiusa	107,971	2.79	0	New
Partido para sa Demokratikong Reporma	68,939	1.78	0	New
Aksyon Demokratiko	39,696	1.03	0	New
Katipunan ng Kamalayang Kayumanggi	21,054	0.54	0	New
Independent	582,761	15.08	3	+3
Total	3,863,894	100.00	16	0
Total votes	614,453	–		
Registered voters/turnout	733,044	83.82		

==== 1st district ====
Cebu City's 1st councilor district consists of the same area as Cebu City's 1st legislative district. Eight councilors are elected from this councilor district.

22 candidates were included in the ballot.

Candidate	Party	Votes	%
Nestor Archival (incumbent)	Laban ng Demokratikong Pilipino	125,485	7.22
Jerry Guardo (incumbent)	PDP–Laban	116,937	6.73
Joel Garganera (incumbent)	Independent	116,190	6.68
Jaypee Labella	PDP–Laban	114,117	6.57
Mary Ann de los Santos	Laban ng Demokratikong Pilipino	106,997	6.16
Joy Young (incumbent)	Laban ng Demokratikong Pilipino	105,791	6.09
Noel Wenceslao	PDP–Laban	102,620	5.90
Jun Alcover	PDP–Laban	102,137	5.88
Alvin Arcilla	Laban ng Demokratikong Pilipino	90,869	5.23
Lea Ouano-Japson (incumbent)	PROMDI	90,622	5.21
Bebs Andales	Laban ng Demokratikong Pilipino	88,838	5.11
Alvin Dizon (incumbent)	Laban ng Demokratikong Pilipino	87,941	5.06
Peter Mancao	PDP–Laban	83,527	4.81
Melvin Legaspi	PDP–Laban	70,102	4.03
Winston Pepito	Partido para sa Demokratikong Reporma	68,939	3.97
Maria Pino Buanghug	PDP–Laban	61,058	3.51
Arturo Barrit	Laban ng Demokratikong Pilipino	46,945	2.70
Boy Labella	Independent	41,995	2.42
Rey Lauron	Aksyon Demokratiko	39,696	2.28
Gian Aznar	PROMDI	36,489	2.10
Edwin Jagmoc	Independent	33,440	1.92
Roy Empleo	Katipunan ng Kamalayang Kayumanggi	7,484	0.43
Total		1,738,219	100.00
Total votes		275,578	–
Registered voters/turnout		337,089	81.75
Source: Commission on Elections

==== 2nd district ====
Cebu City's 2nd councilor district consists of the same area as Cebu City's 2nd legislative district. Eight councilors are elected from this councilor district.

22 candidates were included in the ballot.

Candidate	Party	Votes	%
Dondon Hontiveros	Independent	191,938	9.03
Jose Abellanosa	Laban ng Demokratikong Pilipino	148,667	6.99
Joy Pesquera	PDP–Laban	142,651	6.71
Phillip Zafra (incumbent)	Independent	141,686	6.67
Junjun Osmeña (incumbent)	PDP–Laban	136,288	6.41
James Anthony Cuenco (incumbent)	PDP–Laban	132,868	6.25
Rey Gealon	PDP–Laban	123,387	5.80
Francis Esparis	PDP–Laban	120,914	5.69
Harry Eran	PDP–Laban	118,020	5.55
Pie Abella	Laban ng Demokratikong Pilipino	115,781	5.45
Bobcab Cabbarrubias	Laban ng Demokratikong Pilipino	114,397	5.38
Bea Osmeña	Laban ng Demokratikong Pilipino	113,770	5.35
Yayoy Alcoseba (incumbent)	Laban ng Demokratikong Pilipino	107,280	5.05
Gremar Barete	Laban ng Demokratikong Pilipino	84,317	3.97
Omar Kintanar	Laban ng Demokratikong Pilipino	78,684	3.70
Jack Jaca	Laban ng Demokratikong Pilipino	75,974	3.57
Simeon Romarate	Partido Panaghiusa	60,152	2.83
Gikom Crystal	Partido Panaghiusa	47,819	2.25
Janet Calleno	Independent	19,807	0.93
Sam Panilagao	Independent	19,309	0.91
Ali Cabido	Independent	18,396	0.87
Alan Dinampo	Katipunan ng Kamalayang Kayumanggi	13,570	0.64
Total		2,125,675	100.00
Total votes		338,875	–
Registered voters/turnout		395,955	85.58
Source: Commission on Elections

== Lapu-Lapu City ==
=== Mayor ===
Incumbent Mayor Junard Chan of PDP–Laban ran for a second term.

Chan won re-election against representative Paz Radaza (Lakas–CMD).

Candidate	Party	Votes	%
Junard Chan (incumbent)	PDP–Laban	160,664	76.43
Paz Radaza	Lakas–CMD	49,535	23.57
Total		210,199	100.00
Total votes		217,085	–
Registered voters/turnout		245,395	88.46
PDP–Laban hold			
Source: Commission on Elections

=== Vice Mayor ===
Incumbent Vice Mayor Celsi Sitoy of PDP–Laban ran for a second term.

Sitoy won re-election against city councilor Rico Amores (Lakas–CMD) and Randel Canton (Pederalismo ng Dugong Dakilang Samahan).

Candidate	Party	Votes	%
Celsi Sitoy (incumbent)	PDP–Laban	135,533	70.38
Rico Amores	Lakas–CMD	51,618	26.80
Randel Canton	Pederalismo ng Dugong Dakilang Samahan	5,433	2.82
Total		192,584	100.00
Total votes		217,085	–
Registered voters/turnout		245,395	88.46
PDP–Laban hold			
Source: Commission on Elections

=== City Council ===
The Lapu-Lapu City Council is composed of 14 councilors, 12 of whom are elected.

33 candidates were included in the ballot.

PDP–Laban won 12 seats, gaining a majority in the city council.

Party	Votes	%	Seats	+/–
PDP–Laban	1,496,286	71.91	12	+10
Lakas–CMD	530,429	25.49	0	–10
Pederalismo ng Dugong Dakilang Samahan	37,641	1.81	0	0
Partido Lakas ng Masa	3,123	0.15	0	New
Independent	13,161	0.63	0	0
Total	2,080,640	100.00	12	0
Total votes	217,085	–		
Registered voters/turnout	245,395	88.46		

Candidate	Party	Votes	%
Eugene Espedido	PDP–Laban	135,598	6.52
Abeth Cuizon	PDP–Laban	131,625	6.33
Jun Alforque	PDP–Laban	130,357	6.27
Tino Aying	PDP–Laban	129,665	6.23
Susan Baring	PDP–Laban	129,408	6.22
Janvi dela Serna (incumbent)	PDP–Laban	129,241	6.21
Efren Herrera (incumbent)	PDP–Laban	126,218	6.07
Nelson Yap (incumbent)	PDP–Laban	125,932	6.05
Montor Tatoy	PDP–Laban	115,436	5.55
Jeorgen Eyas-Book	PDP–Laban	114,589	5.51
Joseph Pangatungan	PDP–Laban	114,047	5.48
Emilio Galaroza	PDP–Laban	114,170	5.49
Rex Mangubat (incumbent)	Lakas–CMD	54,231	2.61
Tony Amistad	Lakas–CMD	48,265	2.32
Bobit Hiyas (incumbent)	Lakas–CMD	47,209	2.27
Jose Hayashi	Lakas–CMD	46,059	2.21
Dongdong Berdin	Lakas–CMD	45,668	2.19
Boy Patalinjug	Lakas–CMD	44,518	2.14
Harry Radaza	Lakas–CMD	43,968	2.11
Rudy Potot (incumbent)	Lakas–CMD	42,682	2.05
Junrey Gestopa (incumbent)	Lakas–CMD	42,395	2.04
Boy Flores	Lakas–CMD	42,022	2.02
Gregorio Paquibot Jr. (incumbent)	Lakas–CMD	40,539	1.95
Titing Pejo	Lakas–CMD	32,873	1.58
Fredie Inot	Pederalismo ng Dugong Dakilang Samahan	9,347	0.45
Humprey Elvira	Independent	8,816	0.42
Chakang Caro	Pederalismo ng Dugong Dakilang Samahan	8,594	0.41
Marife Batobalonos	Pederalismo ng Dugong Dakilang Samahan	6,024	0.29
Oliver Linao	Pederalismo ng Dugong Dakilang Samahan	5,388	0.26
Guido Tabaña	Independent	4,345	0.21
Arturo Morala	Pederalismo ng Dugong Dakilang Samahan	4,286	0.21
Ramir Roma	Pederalismo ng Dugong Dakilang Samahan	4,002	0.19
Mhegs Rabanzo	Partido Lakas ng Masa	3,123	0.15
Total		2,080,640	100.00
Total votes		217,085	–
Registered voters/turnout		245,395	88.46
Source: Commission on Elections

== Mandaue ==
=== Mayor ===
Incumbent Mayor Jonas Cortes of PDP–Laban ran for a second term.

Cortes won re-election against former city councilor Olin Seno (Nationalist People's Coalition).

Candidate	Party	Votes	%
Jonas Cortes (incumbent)	PDP–Laban	102,786	55.57
Olin Seno	Nationalist People's Coalition	82,182	44.43
Total		184,968	100.00
Total votes		197,924	–
Registered voters/turnout		234,581	84.37
PDP–Laban hold			
Source: Commission on Elections

=== Vice Mayor ===
Incumbent Vice Mayor Glenn Bercede of PDP–Laban ran for a second term.

Bercede won re-election against former city councilor Boy Cabahug (Nationalist People's Coalition) and Gepind Requierme (Independent).

Candidate	Party	Votes	%
Glenn Bercede (incumbent)	PDP–Laban	110,301	64.42
Boy Cabahug	Nationalist People's Coalition	58,535	34.19
Gepind Requierme	Independent	2,387	1.39
Total		171,223	100.00
Total votes		197,924	–
Registered voters/turnout		234,581	84.37
PDP–Laban hold			
Source: Commission on Elections

=== City Council ===
Since Mandaue's redistricting in 2019, the Mandaue City Council is composed of 14 councilors, 12 of whom are elected.

27 candidates were included in the ballot.

PDP–Laban won 11 seats, maintaining its majority in the city council.

Party	Votes	%	Seats	+/–
PDP–Laban	980,569	63.38	11	+1
Nationalist People's Coalition	460,461	29.76	1	+1
Independent	106,177	6.86	0	0
Total	1,547,207	100.00	12	+2
Total votes	197,924	–		
Registered voters/turnout	234,581	84.37		
Source: Commission on Elections

Candidate	Party	Votes	%
Nerissa Soon-Ruiz (incumbent)	PDP–Laban	103,067	6.66
Malcolm Sanchez (incumbent)	PDP–Laban	95,273	6.16
Jimmy Lumapas (incumbent)	PDP–Laban	90,817	5.87
Jun Arcilla (incumbent)	PDP–Laban	87,637	5.66
Maline Cortes-Zafra (incumbent)	PDP–Laban	83,561	5.40
Cynthia Remedio (incumbent)	PDP–Laban	82,361	5.32
Jen del Mar	PDP–Laban	77,761	5.03
Joel Seno (incumbent)	PDP–Laban	77,237	4.99
Ting Sol Cabahug (incumbent)	PDP–Laban	75,506	4.88
Anjong Icalina (incumbent)	PDP–Laban	71,160	4.60
Edith Cabahug	Nationalist People's Coalition	69,849	4.51
Oca del Castillo	PDP–Laban	68,880	4.45
Mario Bihag	PDP–Laban	67,309	4.35
JP Ceniza	Nationalist People's Coalition	63,023	4.07
Fritz Villamor	Nationalist People's Coalition	62,312	4.03
Isko Ouano	Nationalist People's Coalition	56,965	3.68
Ben Basiga	Independent	42,070	2.72
Tony Dabon	Nationalist People's Coalition	37,314	2.41
Argie Remedio	Nationalist People's Coalition	27,788	1.80
Dalton Roy Echavez	Nationalist People's Coalition	24,760	1.60
Leo Saberon	Nationalist People's Coalition	24,556	1.59
Jojo Bodo	Nationalist People's Coalition	23,629	1.53
Bobot Antigua	Nationalist People's Coalition	22,915	1.48
Paolo Seno	Nationalist People's Coalition	19,790	1.28
Melchor Alejandro	Independent	18,569	1.20
Edsel Ian Fuentes	Independent	14,945	0.97
Emily Borbon	Nationalist People's Coalition	13,956	0.90
Emery Antigua	Nationalist People's Coalition	13,604	0.88
Richard Duaman	Independent	8,596	0.56
Leonardo Alidani	Independent	7,863	0.51
Ester Gesta	Independent	7,396	0.48
Cirilo Oplado	Independent	6,738	0.44
Total		1,547,207	100.00
Total votes		197,924	–
Registered voters/turnout		234,581	84.37
Source: Commission on Elections

== Negros Oriental ==
=== Governor ===
Incumbent Governor Roel Degamo of the Nacionalista Party ran for a second term.

Degamo was initially defeated by Bayawan mayor Pryde Henry Teves of the Nationalist People's Coalition. Ruel Degamo (Independent) and Negros Oriental vice governor Mark Macias (Liberal Party) also ran for governor.

Candidate	Party	Votes	%
Pryde Henry Teves	Nationalist People's Coalition	301,319	44.41
Roel Degamo (incumbent)	Nacionalista Party	281,773	41.53
Ruel Degamo	Independent	49,953	7.36
Mark Macias	Liberal Party	45,454	6.70
Total		678,499	100.00
Total votes		794,292	–
Registered voters/turnout		932,039	85.22
NPC gain from Nacionalista			
Source: Commission on Elections

On December 16, 2021, Ruel Degamo, whose real name is Grego Gaudia, was declared as a nuisance candidate by the Second Division of the Commission on Elections (COMELEC). However, Gaudia, using the name Ruel Degamo, remained on the ballot pending a COMELEC en banc ruling.

On September 1, 2022, the COMELEC en banc declared Gaudia as a nuisance candidate. On September 27, the COMELEC annulled Teves' election and credited Gaudia's votes to Degamo, making Degamo the winner of the election. Degamo took office as governor on October 5.

Candidate	Party	Votes	%
Roel Degamo (incumbent)	Nacionalista Party	331,726	48.89
Pryde Henry Teves	Nationalist People's Coalition	301,319	44.41
Mark Macias	Liberal Party	45,454	6.70
Total		678,499	100.00
Total votes		794,292	–
Registered voters/turnout		932,039	85.22
Nacionalista hold			
Source: Commission on Elections

On February 14, 2023, the Supreme Court affirmed the COMELEC's proclamation of Degamo as the winner.

=== Vice Governor ===
Term-limited incumbent Vice Governor Mark Macias of the Liberal Party ran for governor of Negros Oriental.

Guihulngan mayor Guido Reyes (Nacionalista Party) won the election against provincial board member Erwin Macias (Nationalist People's Coalition) and Jose Aldo Muñoz (Independent).

Candidate	Party	Votes	%
Guido Reyes	Nacionalista Party	263,630	48.14
Erwin Macias	Nationalist People's Coalition	262,376	47.91
Jose Aldo Muñoz	Independent	21,651	3.95
Total		547,657	100.00
Total votes		794,292	–
Registered voters/turnout		932,039	85.22
Nacionalista gain from Liberal			
Source: Commission on Elections

=== Provincial Board ===
The Negros Oriental Provincial Board consists of 13 board members, 10 of whom are elected.

The Nationalist People's Coalition won four seats, remaining as the largest party in the provincial board.

Party	Votes	%	Seats	+/–
Nationalist People's Coalition	458,885	31.26	4	0
Nacionalista Party	452,975	30.86	2	0
Liberal Party	227,712	15.51	2	–1
Lakas–CMD	87,383	5.95	1	New
PROMDI	65,538	4.47	0	New
United Nationalist Alliance	23,541	1.60	0	0
Independent	151,700	10.34	1	0
Total	1,467,734	100.00	10	0
Total votes	794,292	–		
Registered voters/turnout	932,039	85.22		

==== 1st district ====
Negros Oriental's 1st provincial district consists of the same area as Negros Oriental's 1st legislative district. Three board members are elected from this district.

Six candidates were included in the ballot.

Candidate	Party	Votes	%
Jake Reyes (incumbent)	Liberal Party	77,357	22.68
Julius Sabac	Independent	76,151	22.33
Ikay Villanueva	Liberal Party	55,778	16.36
Chester Lim (incumbent)	Liberal Party	54,907	16.10
Anjelica Joanne Estacion	Nacionalista Party	53,307	15.63
Eric Jabel	United Nationalist Alliance	23,541	6.90
Total		341,041	100.00
Total votes		237,082	–
Registered voters/turnout		276,286	85.81
Source: Commission on Elections

==== 2nd district ====
Negros Oriental's 2nd provincial district consists of the same area as Negros Oriental's 2nd legislative district. Four board members are elected from this district.

18 candidates were included in the ballot.

Candidate	Party	Votes	%
Chaco Sagarbarria	Nationalist People's Coalition	107,062	14.49
Nyrth Christian Degamo	Nacionalista Party	99,937	13.53
Woodrow Maquiling Sr.	Nationalist People's Coalition	95,129	12.88
Jun Arnaiz	Lakas–CMD	87,383	11.83
Nilo Sayson	Nacionalista Party	73,555	9.96
Rommel Erames	PROMDI	65,538	8.87
Segfredo Buagas	Nationalist People's Coalition	49,096	6.65
Noel Tabaloc	Nacionalista Party	45,911	6.21
Renz Macion	Liberal Party	28,966	3.92
Tynee Teves	Independent	17,478	2.37
Noel Ramirez	Independent	16,108	2.18
Julius Muñez	Independent	11,424	1.55
Bon Bon Legaspi	Liberal Party	10,704	1.45
Franklin Culanag	Independent	9,495	1.29
Danny Jimenez	Independent	7,394	1.00
Ryan Ybañez	Independent	5,371	0.73
Jorame Andalajao	Independent	4,510	0.61
Arniel Rabe	Independent	3,769	0.51
Total		738,830	100.00
Total votes		312,507	–
Registered voters/turnout		364,529	85.73
Source: Commission on Elections

==== 3rd district ====
Negros Oriental's 3rd provincial district consists of the same area as Negros Oriental's 3rd legislative district. Three board members are elected from this district.

Six candidates were included in the ballot.

Candidate	Party	Votes	%
Kit Marc Adanza (incumbent)	Nationalist People's Coalition	76,176	19.64
Popoy Renacia (incumbent)	Nationalist People's Coalition	70,538	18.19
Carlo Degamo Remontal	Nacionalista Party	69,644	17.96
Edmund Dy	Nacionalista Party	62,079	16.01
Bayang Carballo	Nationalist People's Coalition	60,884	15.70
Pete Baldebrin	Nacionalista Party	48,542	12.52
Total		387,863	100.00
Total votes		244,703	–
Registered voters/turnout		291,224	84.03
Source: Commission on Elections

== Siquijor ==
=== Governor ===
Incumbent Governor Zaldy Villa of PDP–Laban ran for the House of Representatives in Siquijor's lone legislative district.

Villa endorsed his son, representative Jake Vincent Villa, who won the election against Larena mayor Danny Villa (Aksyon Demokratiko).

Candidate	Party	Votes	%
Jake Vincent Villa	Nationalist People's Coalition	32,615	50.96
Danny Villa	Aksyon Demokratiko	31,388	49.04
Total		64,003	100.00
Total votes		69,103	–
Registered voters/turnout		78,458	88.08
NPC gain from PDP–Laban			
Source: Commission on Elections

=== Vice Governor ===
Incumbent Vice Governor Mimi Quezon-Brown of the Nationalist People's Coalition ran for a third term.

Quezon-Brown won re-election against Edwin Yu (Aksyon Demokratiko).

Candidate	Party	Votes	%
Mimi Quezon-Brown	Nationalist People's Coalition	33,932	57.44
Edwin Yu	Aksyon Demokratiko	25,139	42.56
Total		59,071	100.00
Total votes		69,103	–
Registered voters/turnout		78,458	88.08
NPC hold			
Source: Commission on Elections

=== Provincial Board ===
the Siquijor Provincial Board is composed of nine board members, six of whom are elected.

PDP–Laban won five seats, maintaining its majority in the provincial board.

Party	Votes	%	Seats	+/–
PDP–Laban	93,238	57.38	5	0
Aksyon Demokratiko	47,011	28.93	1	New
Partido Federal ng Pilipinas	22,256	13.70	0	0
Total	162,505	100.00	6	0
Total votes	69,103	–		
Registered voters/turnout	78,458	88.08		

==== 1st district ====
Siquijor's 1st provincial district consists of the municipalities of Enrique Villanueva, Larena and Siquijor. Three board members are elected from this provincial district.

Six candidates were included in the ballot.

Candidate	Party	Votes	%
Brylle Tumarong	PDP–Laban	16,166	19.29
Nanding Lingcay (incumbent)	PDP–Laban	15,303	18.26
Erson Digal	PDP–Laban	14,910	17.79
Belyn Tumarong	Aksyon Demokratiko	13,051	15.57
Art Pacatang	Partido Federal ng Pilipinas	12,881	15.37
Dindo Larot	Aksyon Demokratiko	11,504	13.73
Total		83,815	100.00
Total votes		34,346	–
Registered voters/turnout		39,184	87.65
Source: Commission on Elections

==== 2nd district ====
Siquijor's 2nd provincial district consists of the municipalities of Lazi, Maria and San Juan. Three board members are elected from this provincial district.

Six candidates were included in the ballot.

Candidate	Party	Votes	%
Dindo Tumala (incumbent)	PDP–Laban	17,021	21.63
Dondon Asok	PDP–Laban	16,468	20.93
Orville Fua (incumbent)	Aksyon Demokratiko	14,334	18.22
Harold Dalaygon	PDP–Laban	13,370	16.99
Edwin Quimno	Partido Federal ng Pilipinas	9,375	11.91
Jem Masillones	Aksyon Demokratiko	8,122	10.32
Total		78,690	100.00
Total votes		34,757	–
Registered voters/turnout		39,274	88.50
Source: Commission on Elections
