= Duterte (surname) =

Duterte is a surname of French origin, likely derived from Duarte, a name of Iberian and Occitan roots meaning "strong" or "protector".

Notable people with the surname include:

- Henri Duterte (1847–1887), French botanist
- Henrietta Duterte (1817–1903), American philanthropist and abolitionist
- Janet Duterte (born 1970), Filipino actress known professionally as Keanna Reeves
- Melina Duterte (born 1994), American musician, singer, songwriter and music producer, under the stage name Jay Som
- Harold Duterte (born 1978), Filipino politician and businessman
- Kitty Duterte (born 2004), Filipino socialite
- Omar Duterte (born 1994), Filipino businessman and politician
- Paolo Duterte (born 1975), Filipino businessman and politician
- Rigo Duterte (born 1998), Filipino businessman and politician
- Rodrigo Duterte (born 1945), 16th President of the Philippines
- Ronald Duterte (1934–2016), Filipino lawyer and politician
- Sara Duterte (born 1978), 15th Vice President of the Philippines
- Sebastian Duterte (born 1987), Filipino businessman and politician
- Soledad Duterte (1916–2012), Filipino teacher and activist
- Vicente Duterte (1911–1968), Filipino lawyer and politician

== See also ==
- Duterte family
