= Cynthia Chan =

Filipino politician (born 1968)

- Official portrait, 2022

Mayor of Lapu-Lapu City
- Incumbent
- Assumed office June 30, 2025
- Preceded by: Junard Chan

Member of the House of Representatives from Lapu-Lapu's Lone District
- In office June 30, 2022 – June 30, 2025
- Preceded by: Paz Radaza
- Succeeded by: Junard Chan

Personal details
- Born: March 10, 1968 (age 58) Cebu City, Cebu, Philippines
- Party: Lakas (2024–present)
- Other party: PDP (2021–2024)
- Spouse: Junard "Ahong" Chan
- Occupation: Politician
- Nickname: Cindi

Maria Cynthia "Cindi" King Chan (born March 10, 1968) is a Filipino politician who has served as Mayor of Lapu-Lapu City since 2025. Before being elected mayor, she was a member of the House of Representatives from 2022-2025, representing Lapu-Lapu City's at-large congressional district.

== See also ==
- List of female members of the House of Representatives of the Philippines
- 19th Congress of the Philippines
