= Lapu-Lapu City's at-large congressional district =

House of Representatives of the Philippines legislative district

Lapu-Lapu's at-large congressional district
- Constituency for the House of Representatives of the Philippines
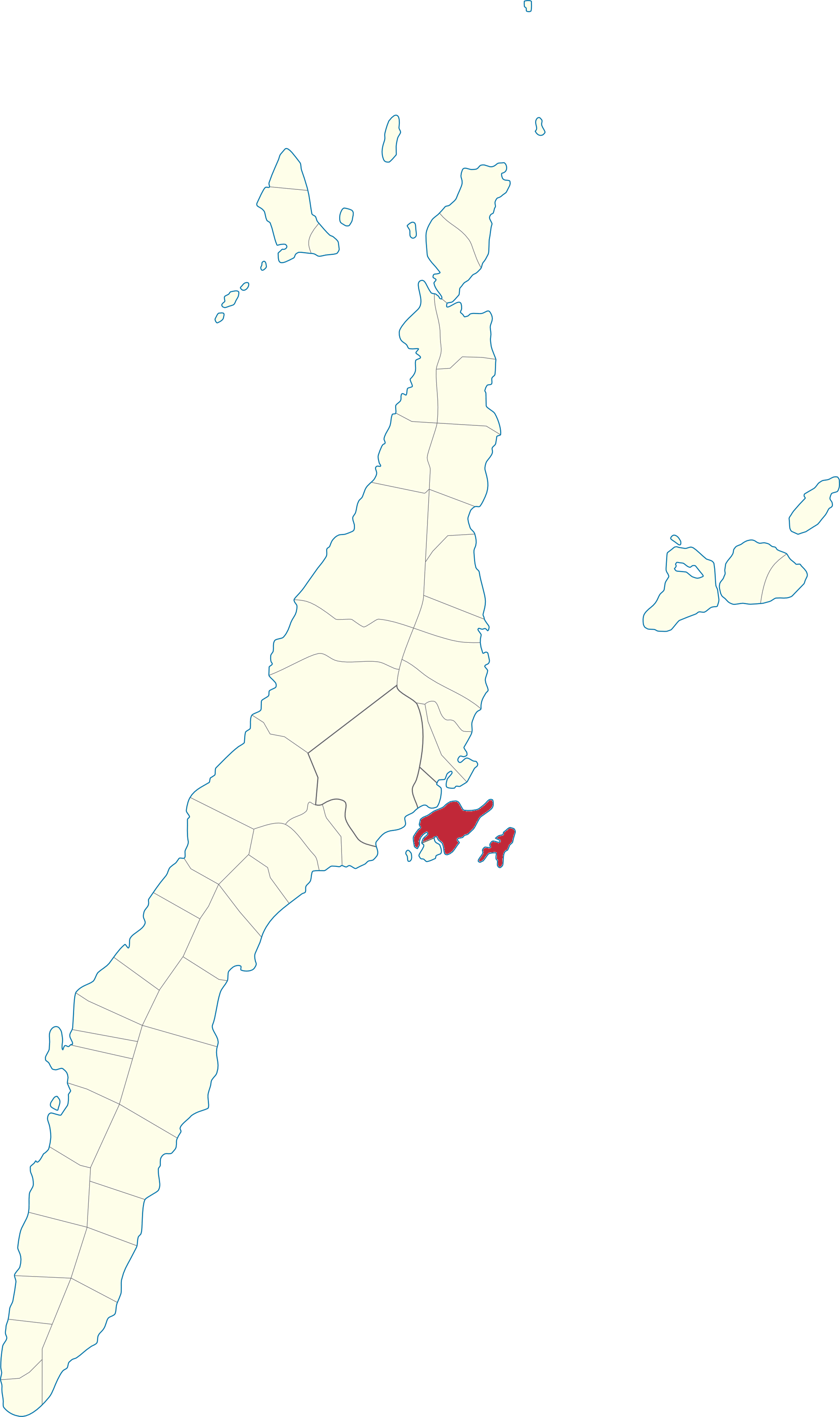
- Map of Cebu showing the location of Lapu-Lapu.
- City: Lapu-Lapu City
- Region: Central Visayas
- Population: 497,604 (2020)
- Electorate: 245,395 (2022)
- Major settlements: Lapu-Lapu City
- Area: 58.10 km^{2} (22.43 sq mi)

Current constituency
- Created: 2009
- Representative: Junard Chan
- Political party: PFP
- Congressional bloc: Majority

Lapu-Lapu's at-large congressional district is the congressional district of the Philippines in Lapu-Lapu City. It has been represented in the House of Representatives of the Philippines since 2010. Previously included in Cebu's 6th congressional district, it includes all barangays of the city. It is currently represented in the 20th Congress by Junard Chan of the Partido Federal ng Pilipinas (PFP).

== Representation history ==
#	Image	Member	Term of office		Congress	Party	Electoral history
#	Image	Member	Start	End	Congress	Party	Electoral history
District created October 22, 2009 from Cebu's 6th district.
1		Arturo Radaza	June 30, 2010	June 30, 2013	15th	Lakas	Elected in 2010.
2		Aileen Radaza	June 30, 2013	June 30, 2019	16th	Lakas	Elected in 2013.
2		Aileen Radaza	June 30, 2013	June 30, 2019	17th	Liberal	Re-elected in 2016.
2		Aileen Radaza	June 30, 2013	June 30, 2019	17th	PDP–Laban	Re-elected in 2016.
3		Paz Radaza	June 30, 2019	June 30, 2022	18th	Lakas	Elected in 2019.
4		Cynthia Chan	June 30, 2022	June 30, 2025	19th	PDP–Laban	Elected in 2022.
4		Cynthia Chan	June 30, 2022	June 30, 2025	19th	Lakas	Elected in 2022.
5		Junard Chan	June 30, 2025	Incumbent	20th	PFP	Elected in 2025.

== Election results ==
=== 2022 ===
Philippine House of Representatives election at Lapu-Lapu City
Party	Candidate	Votes	%
PDP–Laban	Cynthia Chan	147,631	74.16
Lakas	Michael Dignos	38,844	19.51
PDDS	Manuel Degollacion Jr.	6,929	3.48
Liberal	Chezie Demegillo	3,283	1.64
Independent	Genaro Tampus	1,562	0.78
PLM	Junex Doronio	796	0.39
Valid ballots		199,049	91.69
Invalid or blank votes		18,036	8.31
Total votes		217,085	100.00
PDP–Laban gain from Lakas			

=== 2019 ===
Philippine House of Representatives election at Lapu-Lapu City
Party	Candidate	Votes	%
Lakas	Paz Radaza	76,645	52.38
PDP–Laban	Eugene Espedido	62,784	42.90
UNA	Kwin Cabahug	5,628	3.60
WPP	Junex Doronio	1,623	1.10
Valid ballots		146,320	86.92
Invalid or blank votes		22,026	13.08
Total votes		168,346	100.00

=== 2016 ===
Philippine House of Representatives election at Lapu-Lapu City
Party	Candidate	Votes	%
Liberal	Aileen Radaza	86,069	64.63
PDP–Laban	Celsi Sitoy	33,043	24.81
UNA	Reynaldo Berdin	5,967	4.48
Independent	Paulo Cabahug	3,875	2.90
NPC	Rene Espina	2,364	1.77
Independent	Niño Luis Jamili	1,038	0.77
PGRP	Junex Doronio	807	0.60
Valid ballots		133,163	84.18
Invalid or blank votes		25,027	15.82
Total votes		158,190	100.00

=== 2013 ===
Philippine House of Representatives election at Lapu-Lapu City
Party	Candidate	Votes	%
Lakas–Kampi	Aileen Radaza	60,602	44.77
Liberal	Angel Rodriguez	31,630	24.72
Independent	Remegio Oyao	14,375	11.33
Margin of victory		28,972	22.84%
Invalid or blank votes		20,255	15.97
Total votes		126,862	100.00
Lakas hold			

=== 2010 ===
Philippine House of Representatives election at Lapu-Lapu City
Party	Candidate	Votes	%
Lakas–Kampi	Arturo Radaza	70,125	56.33
NPC	Joselito Ruiz	33,100	26.59
Liberal	Eugene Espedido	20,809	16.71
Independent	Rolando Lejarde	461	0.37
Valid ballots		124,495	92.46
Invalid or blank votes		10,158	7.54
Total votes		134,653	100.00
Lakas–Kampi win (new seat)			

== See also ==
- Legislative district of Lapu-Lapu
