= Raymond Alvin Garcia =

Filipino politician and lawyer (born 1977)

The Honorable Raymond Alvin Garcia
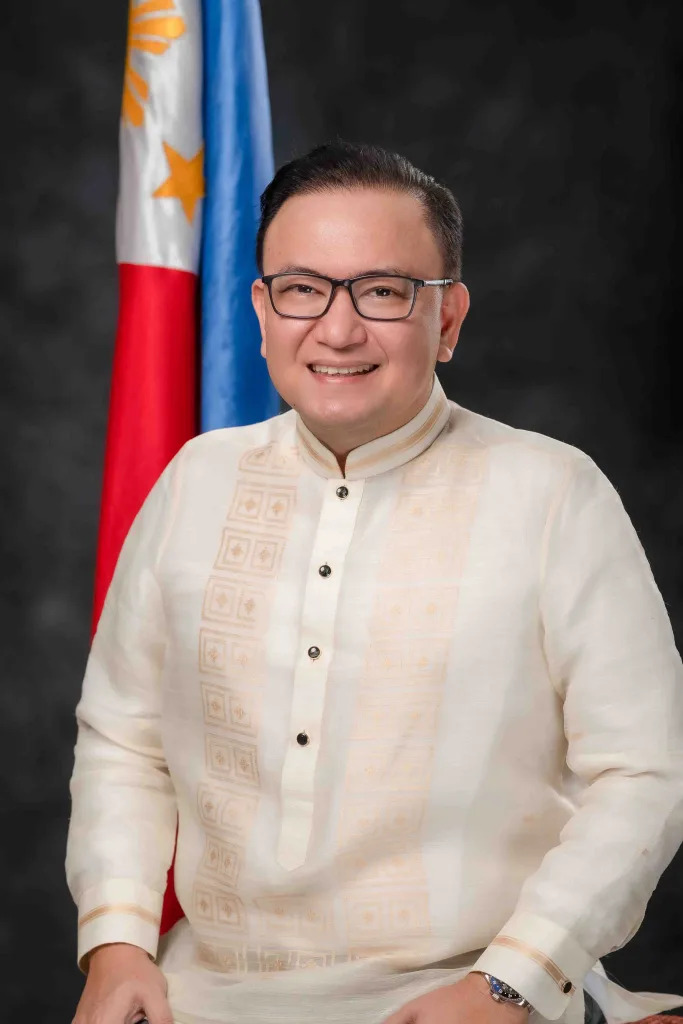
- Official Portrait, 2022

28th Mayor of Cebu City
- In office October 9, 2024 – June 30, 2025
- Vice Mayor: Dondon Hontiveros
- Preceded by: Mike Rama
- Succeeded by: Nestor Archival

Acting Mayor of Cebu City
- In office May 8, 2024 – October 9, 2024
- Mayor: Mike Rama (suspended)

20th Vice Mayor of Cebu City
- In office June 30, 2022 – October 9, 2024
- Mayor: Mike Rama
- Preceded by: Dondon Hontiveros
- Succeeded by: Dondon Hontiveros

Member of the Cebu City Council from the 1st district
- In office June 30, 2016 – June 30, 2022
Council Positions
Majority Floor Leader
In office July 3, 2019 – June 30, 2022
Preceded by	Margot Osmeña
Succeeded by	Joy Pesquera
Minority Floor Leader
In office 2016 – June 30, 2019
Preceded by	Mary Ann delos Santos
Succeeded by	Nestor Archival

Barangay Councilor, Barangay Kamputhaw, Cebu City
- In office November 30, 2010 – June 30, 2016

Personal details
- Born: January 29, 1977 (age 49) Cebu City, Cebu, Philippines
- Party: KUSUG (local; 2007-present); PFP (national; 2024-present)
- Other political affiliations: PDP-Laban (2017–2024); Barug (2015–2024); UNA (2015–2017); Nacionalista (2009–2010); GO (2006–2007)
- Spouse: Julienne Kate Rosca
- Children: 1
- Parents: Alvin Biano Garcia (father); Trinidad Neri Garcia (mother)
- Relatives: Garcia family
- Education: University of Asia and the Pacific, University of San Carlos, Don Bosco Technical High School
- Occupation: Politician, Lawyer
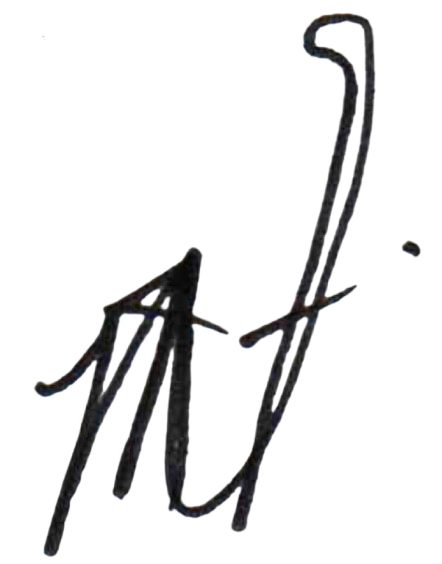
- Signature

Raymond Alvin Neri Garcia (born January 29, 1977) is a Filipino politician and lawyer who served as the 28th Mayor of Cebu City from 2024 to 2025. He was also the city's 20th Vice Mayor from 2022 to 2024 and a City Councilor for the 1st (North) District from 2016 to 2022.

Garcia served as acting mayor following the suspension of Mayor Mike Rama by the Ombudsman on May 8, 2024, and fully assumed the office of Mayor after Rama's dismissal on October 9, 2024. Formerly allies turned political enemies, both of them ran for Mayor in the 2025 Cebu City local elections, losing to city councilor Nestor Archival.

== Early life and career ==
Garcia was born on January 29, 1977 to Alvin Biano Garcia and Trinidad Neri Garcia. Garcia and his father Alvin are the third father-son tandem to have become Mayor of Cebu City after the Dutertes (Ramon and Ronald) and the Osmeñas (Sergio "Serging" Jr. and Tomas), and the second father-son tandem to serve as Vice Mayor (after the Dutertes).

As a member of the Garcia clan, an influential family in Cebuano politics, he is also nephew to former Cebu Governor Gwendolyn Garcia and former Congressman Pablo John Garcia (Alvin's cousins), and second cousin to Tourism Secretary Christina Frasco.

In his high school days at Don Bosco, Garcia was classmates with basketball player Dondon Hontiveros, whom he would later succeed as Vice Mayor and serve alongside as Mayor during Hontiveros's second term as Vice Mayor.

Garcia finished his Bachelor of Laws degree at the University of San Carlos, passing the Bar and signing the roll of attorneys on April 26, 2007. He later completed his MBA at the University of Asia and the Pacific, before going on to serve as Assistant Vice President and Corporate Secretary of SunStar Cebu.

== Political career ==
Garcia first ran for office as the candidate of Kugi Uswag Sugbo (KUSUG) for Vice Mayor in the 2007 Cebu City local elections, losing to incumbent Mike Rama (then a member of Bando Osmeña – Pundok Kauswagan) by 135,601 votes. He later ran for City Councilor from the 1st (North) District in the May 2010 elections, but lost and placed 10th after BOPK candidates won all 8 positions.

In October 2010, Garcia ran for Barangay Councilor of Kamputhaw, Cebu City and won as the top councilor, serving two terms until 2016. He was elected president of the Barangay Councilors' League of the Philippines (BCLP) Cebu City Chapter in 2013, defeating incumbent BCLP National President and Kasambagan Barangay Councilor Franklyn Ong. Garcia was also elected as BCLP National Vice President, where he served until 2016.

According to his official biography, as a lawyer, Garcia provided free legal services for an estimated 27,445 constituents. He also served as a member of the Philippine National Police's Anti-Kidnapping Group (AKG) Advisory Council for Region 7 in 2013, later becoming its chairman in 2018.

=== Cebu City Council (2016-2022) ===
Garcia ran for City Councilor for the North (1st) District of Cebu City in the 2016 Cebu City local elections, filing his certificate of candidacy on October 17, 2015 along with the rest of the Partido Panaghiusa-Team Rama lineup led by re-electionists mayor Mike Rama and vice mayor Edgardo Labella, registered under then-Vice President and opposition leader Jejomar Binay's UNA. His platforms focused on the marginalized sectors, youth, and out-of-school youth. Garcia won and placed 6th among the district's 8 councilors with 95,392 votes, while Rama lost to erstwhile ally Tomas Osmeña and Labella won re-election.

During his first term as City Councilor, Garcia was elected Minority Floor Leader, leading the opposition Team Rama bloc in the council. On August 12, 2016, Garcia was elected Vice President of the Cebu City Chapter of the Philippine Councilors League (PCL). He joined the Partido Demokratiko Pilipino (PDP-LABAN) on November 18, 2017, political party of then-President Rodrigo Duterte, as Team Rama rebranded to BARUG PDP-Laban.

In February 2018, Garcia authored the council's approved resolution asking Mayor Osmeña to close down the Barangay Mayor's Offices (BMOs), saying that the BMOs waste money by duplicating the operations of the barangays themselves. responded that the BMOs' services will continue, saying that the city government "established direct connection to the urban poor and we’re giving them daily service and that’s what [BARUG are] afraid of." Councilor Alvin Arcilla countered that operations such as the BMO were within the mayor's prerogative, citing previous mayor Rama's "City Hall sa Bukid" (City Hall in the Mountains) initiatives.

==== 2019 elections, second term, and COVID-19 pandemic ====
On October 17, 2018, Garcia filed his candidacy for re-election as councilor along with the Partido BARUG PDP-Laban lineup led by Labella (incumbent Vice Mayor, now running for Mayor) and Rama (running for Vice Mayor). Garcia's platforms for his second term would center on the environment, including a ban on single-use plastics. He received the endorsement of the Iglesia Ni Cristo, controversial for its bloc-voting and legal issues. Tensions ran high during the elections, with Garcia accusing Osmeña and BOPK of vote buying.

Following the elections on May 13, 2019, Garcia won re-election with 101,578 votes, ranking 8th in the initial results., rising to 6th after the disqualification of BOPK re-electionists Sisino "Bebs" Andales and Arcilla. Some observers noted that BARUG's landslide victory—the Mayor and Vice Mayor positions, as well as a new council majority—was due in part to what was an unusually involved level of support (for a local election) from President Duterte in favor of BARUG and Labella, with sustained attacks against Osmeña and BOPK.

As the council's new Majority Floor Leader, Garcia explained the decision of the new BARUG majority (10 members, including Vice Mayor Rama as presiding officer) to assign no committee chairmanships to the BOPK minority (9 members)—other than those required by law to be assigned to 2 ex-officio council members—by saying that "[BOPK] were the ones who declined the offer."

On August 21, 2019, Garcia was elected President of the PCL Cebu City Chapter, and later elected chairman of the PCL Regional Council for Region 7 on November 20, 2019.

During the COVID-19 pandemic, Garcia defended the Labella administration amidst multiple allegations of favoritism amongst suppliers, as well as allegations of politicized cash assistance distributed by the Mayor's Information Liaison Officers (MILOs) instead of the city's barangay captains.

==== Legislative portfolio ====
As City Councilor, Garcia authored a total of 43 approved city ordinances, 3,320 resolutions, and 333 committee reports. He also topped the list of councilors with the most ordinances passed in the first year of his second term.

Notable legislation by Garcia includes:

- Retirement benefits for Barangay officials;
- Enhanced Free School Supplies for all Elementary Schools;
- Financial Assistance to Baragnays for COVID-19 Response;
- Pandemic Tax Amnesty for Cebu City Business Owners and Residents;
- Extension of Business Permit Validity to 2 Years;
- Cebu City Anti-Noise Ordinance;
- Cebu City Anti-Speeding Ordinance;
- Gratuity Pay for Contract-of-service City Employees;
- Creation of the Cebu City Heritage District and Cebu City Heritage District Council;
- Institutionalizing the Rajah Tupas Awards and Heritage Awards;
- Celebration of Cebu City Arts Month

=== Vice Mayor (2022-2024) ===
Garcia filed his candidacy for Vice Mayor in the 2022 Cebu City local elections, with Rama (running for Mayor) as his running mate, along with the rest of the BARUG-KUSUG-Panaghiusa coalition on October 9, 2021. The Rama-Garcia tandem was endorsed by outgoing President Duterte on April 2, 2022. Garcia would emerge victorious over LnB Cebu City President Franklyn Ong (BOPK) and former city administrator Francisco "Bimbo" Fernandez (independent), winning 283,235 votes, the highest-ever received by a local candidate in Cebu City.

As vice mayor, Garcia would continue to serve on various city council committees and other bodies within the city government (such as the Cebu City Waterfront Development Commission, or CCWDC), as well as serve as acting mayor whenever mayor Rama would take a temporary absence.

On July 7, 2022, Garcia was elected president of the Cebu chapter of the Vice Mayors League of the Philippines (VMLP). He would later be elected VMLP National Executive Vice President on February 22, 2023.

==== Acting Mayor (2024) ====
On May 8, 2024, Rama was preventatively suspended for 6 months by the Ombudsman pending an investigation into charges of nepotism and grave misconduct. Garcia assumed the post of Acting Mayor on May 14, replacing also-suspended city administrator Collin Rosell and city assessor Maria Teresa Rosell. He also ordered an investigation into alleged harassment against the four city employees who filed the complaint that resulted in Rama's suspension.

The city's long-running dispute with the Cebu Port Authority (CPA) over the ownership of the Compañía Marítima Building was resolved on May 28, 2024 when the city government, represented by Garcia as acting mayor, signed a compromise agreement with the CPA, represented by General Manager Francisco Comendador III. Garcia, in a press conference said the document will be submitted to the court trying the case for Resolution.

Garcia presided over Cebu City's hosting of the 2024 Palarong Pambansa, ordering police to increase visibility and deter crime ahead of and during the games. He would later get into a row with the media over their coverage of problems with the city's hosting of the games, accusing the media of unfair reporting.

==== Rift with Mike Rama ====
As acting mayor, Garcia announced that he would adopt a more diplomatic approach to the city's issues, compared to what he labeled as the more aggressive style of suspended mayor Rama. Despite initially affirming (on February 17) that Garcia was to remain his vice mayoral pick for 2025, Rama would later criticize Garcia's leadership and policy direction as acting mayor with increasing frequency, going on to accuse Garcia of overstepping the functions of an acting mayor (which Garcia denied) and not upholding a promise to refrain from interfering with Rama's policies.

On June 17, 2024, Garcia admitted to the growing distance between him and Rama, saying that he "no longer [felt] positive" about Rama's frequent criticisms, even as he still viewed Rama as a friend. Garcia was noticeably absent from a BARUG gathering on June 12, where Rama hinted towards picking incumbent vice mayor Dondon Hontiveros as his 2025 running mate instead.

On September 23, 2024, Garcia was announced as party president of the newly revived Kugi Uswag Sugbo (KUSUG) party, succeeding his father Alvin. Garcia also announced his openness to running for a full term as Mayor in 2025. Rama officially declared the end of the BARUG-KUSUG coalition and his alliance with Garcia the next day, September 24.

=== Mayor of Cebu City (2024–2025) ===
On October 3, 2024, the Ombudsman found Mayor Rama guilty of nepotism and grave misconduct, ordering his dismissal and permanent disqualification from office. Garcia took his oath as the 28th Mayor of Cebu City on October 9, 2024, being sworn in by DILG Regional Director Leocadio Trovela. Among his outlined priorities after his oathtaking were priorities as socialized housing, the Cebu Bus Rapid Transit, and the city's 2025 annual budget. While Garcia would continue some of Rama's projects, he discarded Rama's "Singapore-like Cebu City" vision, saying that Cebu should develop based on its own identity and strengths.

On October 31, 2024, Rama announced that he would challenge Garcia's assumption, filing a case for usurpation of authority. The Ombudsman would go on to dismiss at least 8 complaints filed by Rama, his allies, and his ex-employees, upholding the legitimacy of Garcia's full assumption as Mayor.

In February 2025, Garcia proposed the transfer of the Cebu City Hall to a new P500 million complex at the South Road Properties. The proposal was opposed by council minority floor leader Nestor Archival, citing the area's current inaccessibility to public transport and other more pressing priorities the funds should be spent on.

==== 2025 mayoral campaign ====
On October 8, 2024, Garcia filed his candidacy for Mayor together with former councilor Jose "Joey" Daluz III as his running mate for the 2025 elections, heading the new coalition between KUSUG and Partido Panaghiusa. Garcia campaigned on his accomplishments over the past 10 months as mayor with the tagline "Aksyon Karon, Dili Unya" (Action Now, Not Later) The coalition's campaign was managed by Daluz, who also previously managed multiple campaigns for the former BARUG-KUSUG-Panaghiusa alliance.

Throughout the election season, Garcia consistently remained the frontrunner in mayoral surveys, placing ahead of main rivals Rama and Archival. Despite this, during the elections on May 12, 2025, Garcia ended up losing to Archival by 79,230 votes in what was described as a "stunning upset." His loss also mirrored that of his aunt, incumbent Cebu Governor Gwen Garcia, who unexpectedly lost to neophyte Pam Baricuatro by 342,873 votes. Observers noted voters' desire for change due to Cebuanos' fatigue with the Garcia clan's longtime grip on power as a political dynasty.

Shortly after the COMELEC proclaimed Archival's victory on the morning of May 13, Garcia conceded defeat in the mayoral race and pledged his support to Archival. Garcia admitted he did not expect the outcome, and pledged to focus on finishing the rest of his term until June 30, looking forward to spend more time with family and friends afterwards, as well as return to practicing corporate law.

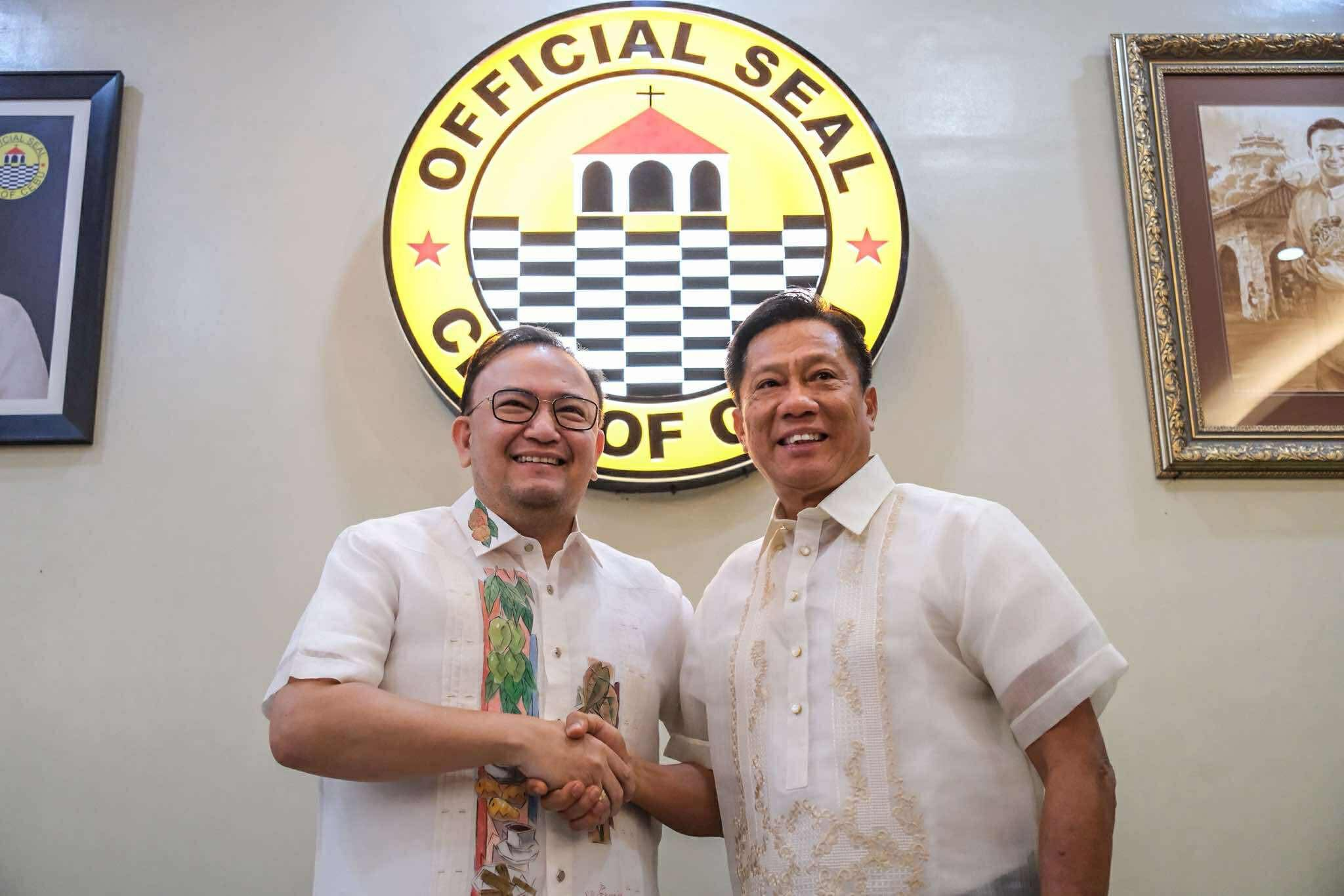
Outgoing Cebu City Mayor Garcia and Mayor-elect Nestor Archival hold a transition meeting on May 26, 2025.

On May 26, Garcia and Archival held their first formal transition meeting along with their respective teams, facilitated by the DILG. Garcia assured Archival of a smooth transition, as well as offering advice and support. His term as mayor ended on June 30, 2025, when Archival assumed office.

== Controversies ==
=== COVID-19 pandemic chicken donations ===
At the height of the COVID-19 pandemic, Garcia, South (2nd) District Rep. Eduardo "Edu" Rama Jr., and former Labella assistant Eugenio Faelnar were sued for the alleged illegal selling of over 17,000 chickens donated as food aid for the most-affected areas of the city. The case was dismissed by the Ombudsman on May 11, 2023, citing insufficient evidence.

=== CBRT hazard case ===
On October 11, 2024, independent mayoral aspirant and former Bureau of Customs commissioner Yogi Ruiz filed a case against Garcia before the Ombudsman, accusing Garcia of disregarding road safety in the construction of the Cebu Bus Rapid Transit System and being negligent with the removal of construction debris. Garcia welcome the case, saying that Ruiz had the right to file suit. This was the first case filed against Garcia after his full assumption as city mayor.

=== Illegal cockfighting case ===
On November 24, 2024, Garcia was sued on criminal and administrative charges after allegedly allowing illegal cockfighting in a hotel despite lacking proper city council approval. The charges were filed by Kristian Hassamal, a former city official and ally of Rama. According to Hassamal, Garcia “knowingly and willfully” allowed the events despite the venue not being a licensed cockpit, the absence of proper permits, and the events exceeding the number of days allowed for cockfights. The Ombudsman found sufficient basis to investigate the complaints, ordering Garcia and another respondent on January 24, 2025 to submit their counter-affidavits and evidence.

=== Dole-outs and malversation case ===
Opposition councilor Mary Ann de los Santos delivered a privilege speech on March 19, 2025 criticizing a rice distribution program that allegedly politically favored Garcia for the upcoming elections, questioning why P49 million (around USD 880,000) in disaster funds was used to purchase rice despite the absence of a declared state of calamity. Garcia countered that the funds used for the rice were taken from the city's social services.

On April 14, 2025, Garcia and four other city officials were sued for technical malversation before the Ombudsman. According to the complaint, public documents available on the city government’s website showed that the rice purchases went to the Cebu City Disaster Risk Reduction and Management Office (CCDRRMO).

== Electoral history ==
More detailed lists of candidates and votes in each election may be found in the respective election's article.

Electoral history of Raymond Alvin N. Garcia
Year	Office Constituency	Party (Note: Filipino local politicians more commonly campaign in their constituencies based on local parties and alliances, rather than on their national parties. It is also common for local parties and alliances to switch affiliations to another national party, especially following a change in presidential administration.)		Main opponent (Note: The listed main opponent is either the victorious candidate (in an election defeat) or the second-ranked candidate (in a victory). No main opponent is listed for positions with multiple officeholders, e.g. City Councilor.)		Votes for Garcia					Result	Ref
Year	Office Constituency	Local	National	Name	Party	Total	%	±%	Mgn. (Note: For offices with only one winner (e.g. Mayor), margins shown are over the main or winning opponent. For offices with multiple winners (e.g. City Council), margins shown are over the highest-ranked losing candidate.)	P. (Note: The top 8 candidates for the Cebu City Council in each district are elected. All 16 councilors are ranked based on how much votes they each got compared to all other councilors, rather than on their rankings within their district. In contrast, only the 1st-ranked candidate for Mayor, Vice Mayor, and Representative posts wins.)	Result	Ref
2007	Vice Mayor; Cebu City	KUSUG	GO	Michael Rama (Incumbent)	BOPK	82,640	—N/a	—N/a	—N/a	2nd	Lost	
2010	City Councilor; Cebu City 1st district	KUSUG	Nacionalista	—N/a		53,818	4.68%	—N/a	-2.01%	10th	Lost	
2010	Barangay Councilor; Kamputhaw, Cebu City	Nonpartisan (Note: While Barangay officials and alliances commonly align with City- or Municipal-level political parties, they are officially required to be nonpartisan and independent of political parties during Barangay elections, as per Section 4 of the Barangay Election Act of 1982.)		—N/a		—N/a	—N/a	—N/a	—N/a	1st	Won	
2013	Barangay Councilor; Kamputhaw, Cebu City	Nonpartisan		—N/a		—N/a	—N/a	—N/a	—N/a	1st	Won	
2016	City Councilor; Cebu City 1st district	Barug	UNA	—N/a		95,392	6.25%	—N/a	0.28%	6th	Won	
2019	City Councilor; Cebu City 1st district	Barug	PDP-Laban	—N/a		101,578	6.98%	+0.73%	0.55%	6th	Won	
2022	Vice Mayor; Cebu City	Barug	PDP-Laban	Franklyn Ong	BOPK	283,235	52.21%	— (Note: 2022 vote percentage non-comparable to previous election due to running for a position with a single officeholder (Representative) after previously running for a position with multiple officeholders (City Councilor).)	11.15%	1st	Won	
2025	Mayor; Cebu City	KUSUG	PFP	Nestor Archival	BOPK	176,967	30.30%	-21.91%	-13.16%	2nd	Lost	

== Personal life ==
In 2019, Garcia married Julienne Kate Rosca in a civil wedding officiated by Mayor Edgar Labella, who wanted Garcia's marriage to be the first he would officiate as mayor. They had their church wedding on February 2, 2022, leading eight other couples in a church wedding at the Cebu Metropolitan Cathedral officiated by Monsignor Roberto Alesna. Garcia has one daughter.

== Ancestry ==
Ancestors of Raymond Alvin Garcia

32. Pablo Antonio Garcia
16. Antonio Garcia
33. Nieves Fortich y Gonzales
8. Vicente Garcia
17. Gabriela Oracoy
4. Jesus Garcia Sr.
36. Felix Carreon Paras
18. Procopio Paras
37. Lorenza Flores
9. Josefa Paras
19. Romana Carsolin
2. Alvin Garcia
10. Marcos Biaño
5. Severiana Biaño
22. Juan Ouano
11. Marcela Ouano
46. Benito Cabahug Jr.
23. Eustacia Cabahug
47. Tomasa Sanchez
1. Raymond Alvin Garcia
6. Jesus Borromeo Neri
3. Trinidad Neri
7. Paz Litonjua Zamora

== Honors and awards ==
Garcia is a recipient of the following honors and awards:

- Leadership Award from the Rotary Club of Banilad Metro, given in 2016;
- Most Outstanding City Councilor, Alpha Kappa Rho (AKRHO) fraternity's choice awards, given on April 3, 2018;
- Outstanding Bosconian Award in the field of Public Service, given by Don Bosco on Feb. 12, 2019;
- Maharlika Award from the Bureau of Local Government Finance (under the Department of Finance) for achieving the highest locally sourced tax revenue in Central Visayas (Region 7) and maintaining sound financial performance, given in June 2025.

== See also ==
- List of people from Cebu
- Mayor of Cebu City
- Cebu City Council

Political offices
Preceded by Mary Ann delos Santos	Minority Floor Leader of the Cebu City Council; 2016 – 2019	Succeeded by Nestor Archival
Preceded by Margot Osmeña	Majority Floor Leader of the Cebu City Council; 2019 – 2022	Succeeded by Joy Pesquera
Preceded by Dondon Hontiveros	20th Vice Mayor of Cebu City; June 30, 2022 – October 9, 2024	Succeeded by Dondon Hontiveros
Preceded by Mike Rama	28th Mayor of Cebu City; October 9, 2024 – June 30, 2025	Succeeded by Nestor Archival
Party political offices
Preceded by Alvin Garcia	President of Kugi Uswag Sugbo; 2021-present	Incumbent
