= Nestor Archival =

Mayor of Cebu City since 2025

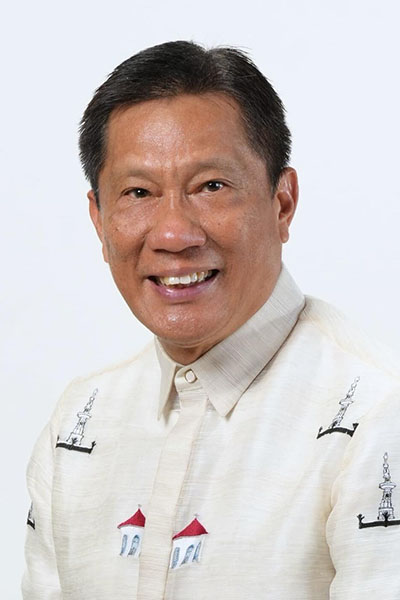
- Official portrait, 2026

29th Mayor of Cebu City
- Incumbent
- Assumed office June 30, 2025
- Vice Mayor: Tomas Osmeña
- Preceded by: Raymond Alvin Garcia

Vice Mayor of Cebu City
- In office December 11, 2015 – February 8, 2016; Acting
- Mayor: Edgardo Labella (Acting)
- Preceded by: Edgardo Labella
- Succeeded by: Edgardo Labella

Member of the Cebu City Council from the 1st district
- In office June 30, 2019 – June 30, 2025
- In office June 30, 2013 – June 30, 2016
- In office June 30, 2001 – June 30, 2010
- In office June 30, 1995 – June 30, 1998
Council Positions
Minority Floor Leader
In office July 3, 2019 – June 30, 2025
Preceded by	Raymond Alvin Garcia
Succeeded by	Sisinio Andales

Personal details
- Born: Nestor Dionson Archival Sr. June 2, 1958 (age 68) Cebu City, Cebu, Philippines
- Party: BOPK (local; since 2000); Liberal (national; 2009–2018; since 2024)
- Other political affiliations: LDP (2018–2024); Lakas–CMD (1994–1997; 2004–2009); PROMDI (2000–2004); LAMMP (1997–2000)
- Children: 2
- Education: University of San Carlos (BS)
- Occupation: Politician, businessman
- Profession: Electrical Engineer, Environmentalist

Nestor Dionson Archival Sr. (born June 2, 1958) is a Filipino politician, electrical engineer, businessman and environmentalist serving as the 29th Mayor of Cebu City since 2025. Before being elected mayor, he served as a member of the Cebu City Council for the first district since 2019, a seat he previously held from 2013 to 2016, 2001 to 2010, and 1995 to 1998. Archival is a longtime member of the Osmeña-founded political party Bando Osmeña – Pundok Kauswagan (BOPK).

== Early life and education ==
Archival was born on June 2, 1956 in Sirao, Cebu City to farmer Epifanio Archival and public school teacher Brigida Dionson. After his family moved to Talamban in 1965, Archival was active in the Boy Scout during his elementary years, serving as a scout leader. He completed his secondary education at Abellana National High School and earned his undergraduate degree from the University of San Carlos (USC), where he also served as vice president of the USC Supreme Student Council (SSC).

After graduating from the University of San Carlos, Archival passed the licensure examination for electrical engineers, placing 16th nationwide. He is a registered professional electrical engineer and a member of the Institute of Integrated Electrical Engineers of the Philippines, Inc.

== Early career ==
Archival is the founder and owner of N.A. Systems Inc., a Cebu City-based electrical construction company.

Archival built the Archival Eco-House in his residence in Sitio Ylaya, Talamban, Cebu City. The house runs on solar power and relies on rainwater for its water supply. In 2014, Archival was awarded for his eco-house and green advocacy by the Department of Environment and Natural Resources (DENR) and Philippine Information Agency (PIA).

== Cebu City Council (1995–1998, 2001–2010, 2013–2016) ==
Archival first ran for public office in 1994, but was unsuccessful in his bid for Barangay Captain of Talamban, Cebu City. He then ran for the Cebu City Council in 1995 under the slate of then-Mayor Alvin Garcia and won a seat representing the 1st (North) District. Archival ran for re-election as an affiliate of President Joseph Estrada's Laban ng Makabayang Masang Pilipino (LAMMP), but placed 9th and lost.

After Garcia bolted Bando Osmeña – Pundok Kauswagan (BOPK) to found Kugi Uswag Sugbo (KUSUG) along with incumbent councilors allied with former Mayor Tomas Osmeña, the latter was advised to recruit the top-ranked losing 1998 councilor candidate for BOPK's 2001 lineup. As a result, Archival joined BOPK in 2000, successfully returned to the city council in 2001 as part of a BOPK sweep of local elected positions, and later secured re-election in 2004 and 2007 for three consecutive terms. Due to term limits, he did not seek re-election in 2010.

In the 2013 elections, Archival was once again elected as city councilor, ranking first among North District candidates with 106,135 votes, and sixth overall in the Council behind the top five candidates from the more populous South (2nd) District.

During his tenure as councilor, Archival opted to donate his government salary to fund scholarships for underprivileged students. In 2001, he also established the Nestor Archival Rescue and Fire (NARF) Brigade, a volunteer organization composed of firefighters, paramedics, and other first responders.

== 2016 vice mayoral campaign ==
On October 15, 2015, Archival filed his Certificate of Candidacy for Vice Mayor before the Cebu City COMELEC for the 2016 elections, together with his running-mate and mayoral candidate, Tomas Osmeña, and the rest of the BOPK lineup. Archival was challenging incumbent Vice Mayor Edgardo Labella, who was running for re-election along with incumbent Mayor Mike Rama, after both defeated Osmeña's tandem in 2013.

On May 10, 2016, Archival lost to Labella by 29,864 votes. Osmeña, however, defeated Rama by 33,894 votes and was proclaimed Mayor of Cebu City.

== Cebu City Council (2019–2025) ==
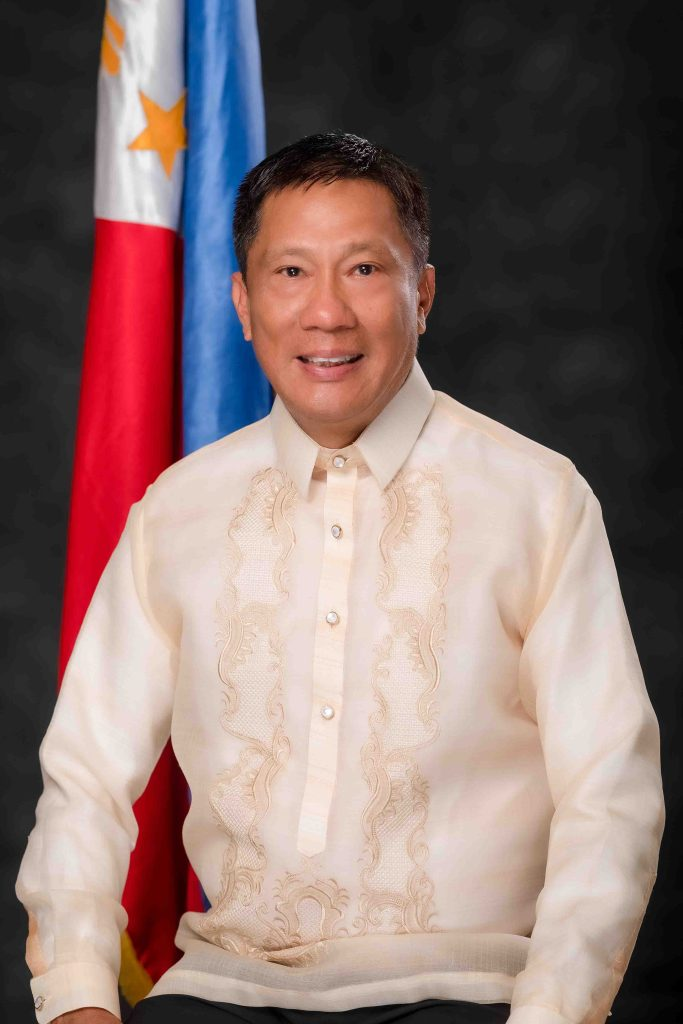
Archival's official portrait as Cebu City Councilor, 2022

Archival ran for councilor again in 2019, securing the highest number of votes among North District candidates with 124,466, placing fifth overall behind the top four councilors from the South District. He repeated this performance in the 2022 elections, once again ranking first in the North District and seventh overall in the council.

Following the council's reorganizational session on July 3, 2024, Archival criticized the council's rejection of a motion to bring back the "Citizen's Hour" forum during council sessions, a forum previously held during weekly council sessions that allowed for direct interaction between the public and legislators.

In February 2025, Archival opposed Mayor Raymond Alvin Garcia’s proposal to relocate Cebu City Hall to a new ₱500-million complex at the South Road Properties, citing concerns over the site's limited access to public transportation and other priorities for public spending.

=== Legislative record ===
According to accomplishment reports published by Archival’s office, he was involved in passing a total of 335 city ordinances and resolutions in 2023, and 236 in 2024. Among these were:

- An ordinance to standardize training for barangay electricians (2023).
- The creation of an ad hoc committee for the SRP Pond A and Inayawan Landfill (2023).
- The revival of the free bus ride program (2024).
- Legislation supporting and recognizing delivery riders (2024).
- A land swap agreement between Cebu City and the provincial government (2024).
- Measures broadening financial assistance for senior citizens (2024).
- Initiatives to enhance the provision of free school supplies for elementary schools (2024).
- An ordinance addressing flood control (2024).

== 2025 Cebu mayoral campaign ==
On October 8, 2024, Archival filed his certificate of candidacy for Mayor of Cebu City alongside his running mate, former Mayor Tomas Osmena, and the rest of BOPK's candidates. His campaign used the tagline “Serbisyo para sa masa, dili para sa bulsa” (Service for the masses, not for the pockets)

Archival's platforms emphasized three key areas:

- Innovation and Economic Development: Proposals included establishing a hub for AI and robotics development, job creation initiatives, and the implementation of 24/7 government services;
- Social Services and Welfare: Commitments to provide free education from elementary to tertiary levels, access to healthcare and hospitalization, and support for marginalized groups;
- Environment and Infrastructure: Plans to address traffic congestion, flooding, garbage disposal, water supply, and food security.

Archival also advocated for the restoration of Cebu City's CHAMP hospitalization assistance program and improvements to bicycle lane infrastructure.

During the campaign period, opinion surveys consistently showed Archival trailing behind incumbent Mayor Raymond Alvin Garcia—the consistent survey frontrunner—as well as former Mayor Michael Rama. Archival attributed these challenges to limited funding and organizational support, noting that only 2 of the city’s 80 barangay captains had endorsed his candidacy.

On May 12, 2025, Archival won the mayoral election in what media outlets described as an upset victory. He credited the outcome to a grassroots-oriented campaign strategy, which focused on direct engagement with voters in the absence of financial resources and institutional backing. The COMELEC proclaimed Archival and other winning city officials early the next morning, May 13. Shortly after, Garcia conceded defeat in the mayoral race and expressed his support for Archival’s incoming administration.

== Mayor of Cebu City (since 2025) ==
=== Transition ===
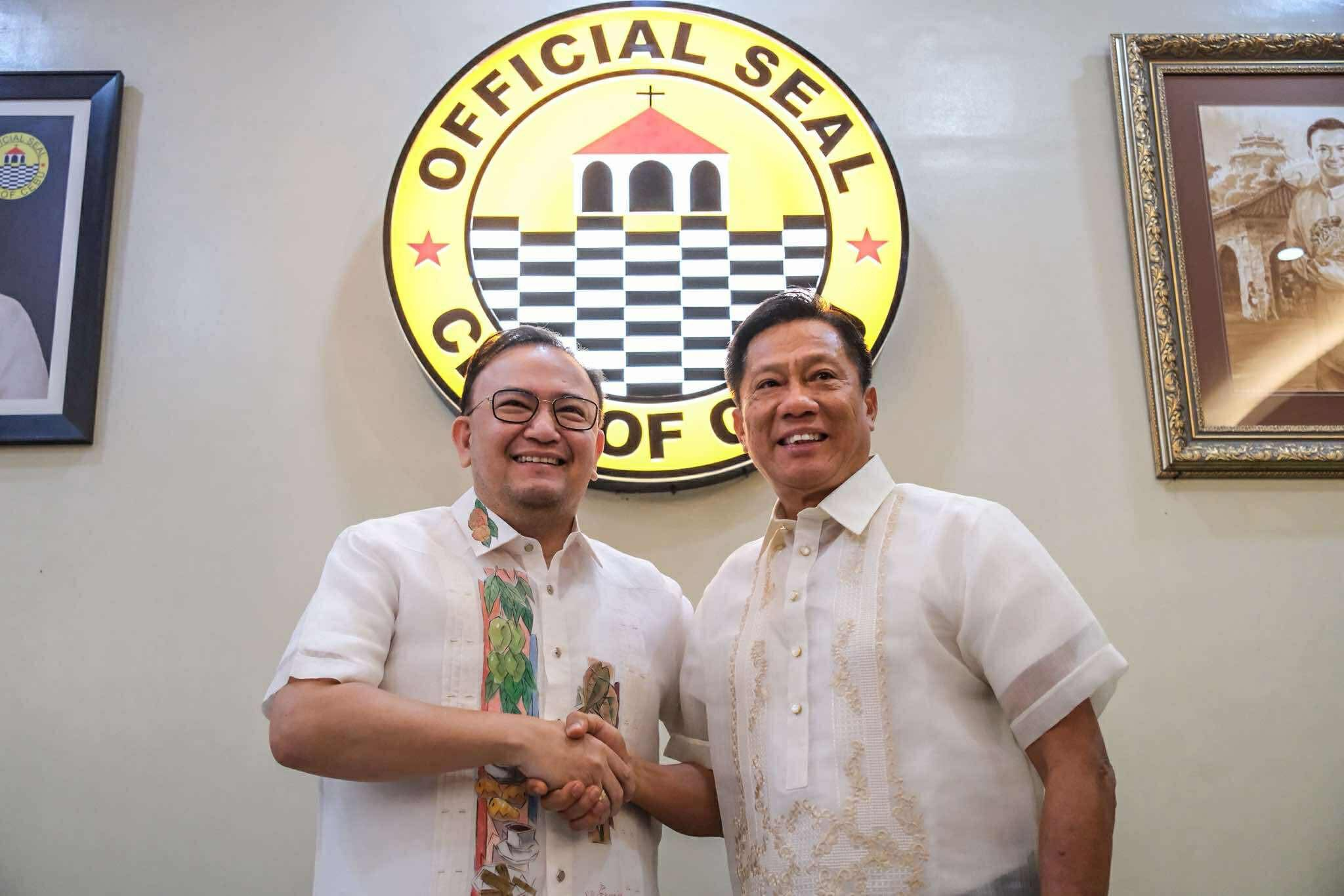
Outgoing Cebu City Mayor Garcia and Mayor-elect Nestor Archival hold a transition meeting on May 26, 2025.

During and after his campaign, Archival announced his plans to implement 24/7 government services at the Cebu City Hall, which will make it the first city hall in the entire Philippines to do so. On May 26, Garcia and Archival held their first formal transition meeting along with their respective teams, facilitated by the Department of the Interior and Local Government (DILG). Garcia assured Archival of a smooth transition, as well as offering advice and support.

On May 22, 2025, Archival announced that city employees will be staying in place for the first three months of his term, in contrast to the usual practice of changing most employees (especially contractual and job-order workers) when a new mayor takes office. This was in response to mounting concerns from city employees, as well as a request Garcia made during a May 19 press conference to retain employees, especially those with institutional knowledge. Archival estimated the number of city employees at 10,000 and announced that his team will be conducting a comprehensive review of the city's resources and workforce before implementing any major personnel changes.

In a June 26 interview with broadcaster Jason Monteclar, Osmeña criticized Archival and BOPK, stating that he "felt betrayed" after the outgoing city council, during its final session, unanimously approved an ordinance aligning the city's land-use map with the newly-approved Comprehensive Land Use Plan (CLUP). Osmeña alleged that ordinance was a means to allow the privatization of Carbon Market by Megawide through updating the market's classification from institutional to commercial, and that bribery was likely involved. Vendors and civil society groups also accused Archival of breaking his promise to push for the ordinance's deferment after Archival quietly walked out of the council's session hall before the vote.

Archival, in a phone interview the next day, June 27, denied that he betrayed anyone. He answered that the CLUP had been pending for 29 years to the city's detriment, that he had sought a deferment of the vote from outgoing majority floor leader Councilor Jocelyn "Joy" Pesquera only for the council to proceed anyway, and that the ordinance could be reviewed under his incoming administration should problems arise in its implementation.

=== Administration ===
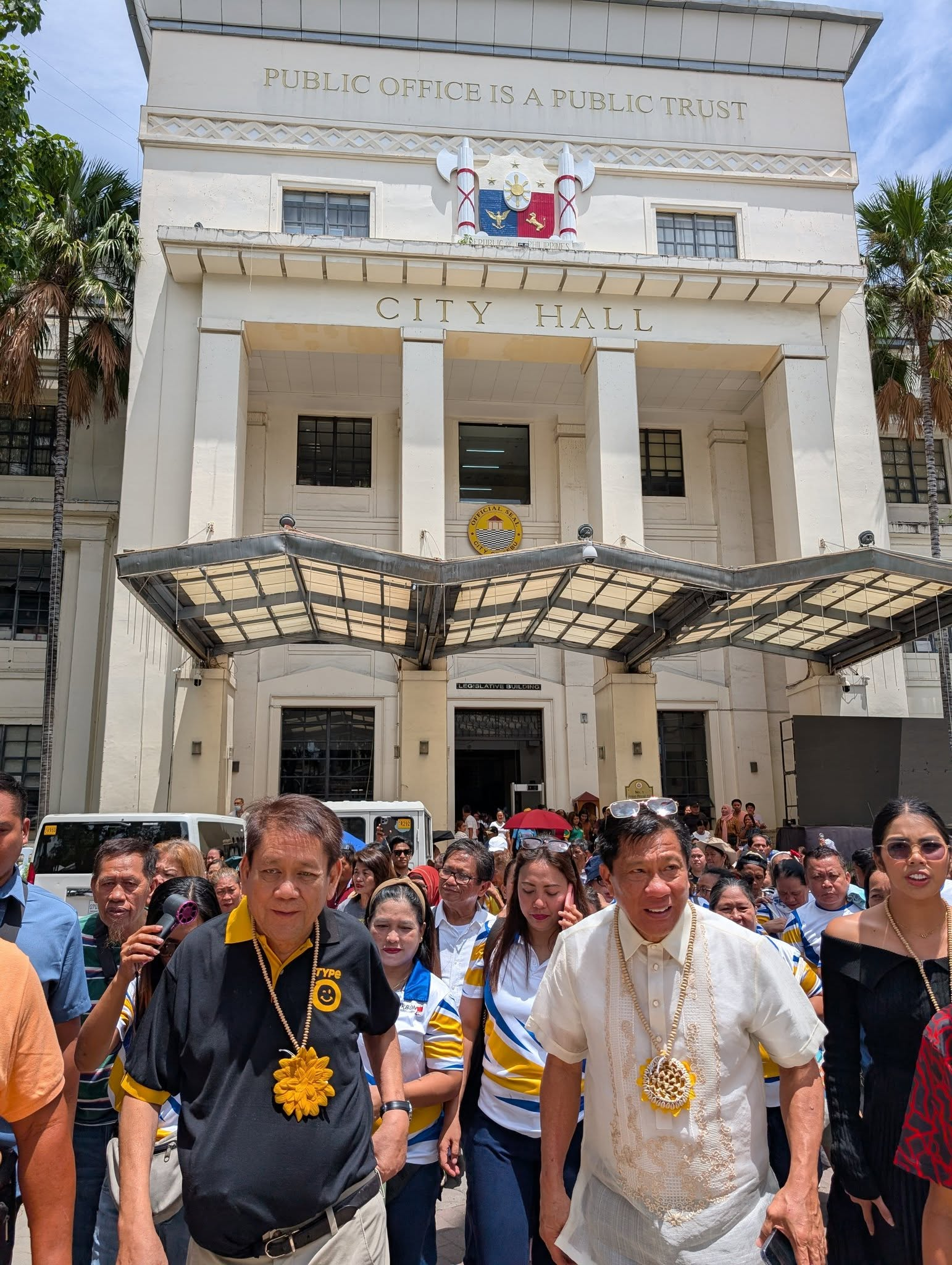
Archival (right) and Vice Mayor Tomas Osmeña assume office on June 30, 2025

Archival took his ceremonial oath of office as the 29th Mayor of Cebu City at Plaza Sugbu on June 26, 2025, alongside Osmeña and the rest of the elected councilors from BOPK. Barangay Inayawan Captain Kirk Bryan Repollo administered Archival's oath of office. His term officially began on June 30. Archival called on his constituents to support his administration, stating that his goal of making Cebu City "number 1 again" required a city-wide vision to become reality. One of his first acts in office was the reopening of the Cebu City Public Library on a 24-hour operating schedule on June 30.

On July 9, 2025, Archival and Osmeña held the Cebu City Council's inaugural session without using any public funds, with only modest snacks personally paid for by the city officials themselves. By comparison, reports from the city government cite between P300,000 and P490,000 in expenses for inaugural sessions under previous administrations. Archival cited the city's looming P6.8 billion budget deficit, attributing it to overspending in past years, as a factor in trimming expenses.

During the session, Archival called on the opposition-dominated council (where BARUG and KUSUG hold a two-thirds supermajority, enough to override mayoral vetos) to cooperate with the administration. He also announced a 10-point agenda aimed at "making Cebu City number one again", as reported by Cebu Daily News:

1. Health: A fully-operational Cebu City Medical Center, expanded Long Life programs for senior citizens, mobile clinics, free medical missions, and public drinking stations ink ey areas.
2. Food Security and Agriculture: Pilot farms, farm-to-market roads, food innovation hubs, a city food bank in collaboration with the Province of Cebu, lowered production costs for farmers, and promoting sustainable agriculture.
3. Education and Nutrition: More inclusive scholarship programs, expanding student aid, accessible 24/7 public libraries, vocational training with TESDA, and tackling classroom hunger.
4. Business and Livelihood Development: Fast-tracking digitization of business permits and transactions and a "Better Business Section" for small businesses.
5. Climate Resilience and Infrastructure: Rainwater catchment systems, solar-powered facilities, stricter solid waste management, a city-wide feasibility study for seweage treatment, City Hall ban on single-use plastics, and a tree-planting program targeting 250,000 new trees.
6. Housing and Urban Development: Community-centered relocation with access to basic services and disaster readiness programs and negotiating with the provincial government to resolve the 93-1 lot issue.
7. Traffic Mitigation: Completing the CBRT and the North-South Expressway, stricter counterflow policies, and enhancing public transport with signal systems and night buses for BPO workers.
8. Public Safety and Social Services: AI-powered CCTV systems, stronger police presence, QR helpdesks, emergency call boxes, 24/7 city hotline for city concerns, and peace education in schools under the "Bantay Kalinaw" initiative.
9. Revenue Generation: Increase efficiency in revenue collection, lease underutilized government assets, and monetize idle properties through eco-tourism parks and public-private partnerships.
10. Inclusion and Welfare: Support programs for senior citizens, PWDs, solo parents, youth, vendors, transport drivers, LGBTQIA+ individuals, animal welfare advocates, and other marginalized sectors.

DILG Secretary Jonvic Remulla appointed Archival as chairperson of the Regional Peace and Order Council (RPOC) of Region 7 for the 2025–2028 term on November 6, 2025, succeeding former Lapu-Lapu City mayor and now-Representative Junard Chan. As reported by SunStar Cebu, the Region 7 RPOC coordinates local government units, law enforcement agencies, and other stakeholders in maintaining peace and order across Cebu City and the Provinces of Cebu and Bohol.

On November 20, 2025, Archival met with Israeli Ambassador to the Philippines Dana Kursh, during which he discussed the city's long-term development framework "Cebu 2035" and the completion of the CCMC. His Facebook post of the event attracted significant online backlash, with local commenters citing the ongoing Gaza genocide being carried out by Israel in Palestine.

== Electoral history ==
Since 1994, Archival ran in a total of 11 elections, with eight wins and eleven losses. He was thrice-elected as the top-ranking North (1st) District city councilor in 2013, 2019, and 2022. More detailed lists of candidates and votes in each election may be found in the respective election's article.

Electoral history of Nestor D. Archival Sr.
Year	Office Constituency	Party (Note: Filipino local politicians more commonly campaign in their constituencies based on local parties and alliances, rather than on their national parties. It is also common for local parties and alliances to switch affiliations to another national party, especially following the election of a new President.)		Main opponent (Note: The listed main opponent is either the victorious candidate (in an election defeat) or the second-ranked candidate (in a victory). No main opponent is listed for positions with multiple officeholders, e.g. City Councilor.)		Votes for Archival					Result	Ref
Year	Office Constituency	Local	National	Name	Party	Total	%	Swing	Mgn. (Note: For offices with only one winner (e.g. Mayor), margins shown are over the main or winning opponent. For offices with multiple winners (e.g. City Council), margins shown are over the highest-ranked losing candidate.)	P. (Note: The top 8 candidates for the Cebu City Council in each district are elected. All 16 councilors are ranked based on how much votes they each got compared to all other councilors, rather than on their rankings within their district. In contrast, only the 1st-ranked candidate for Mayor, Vice Mayor, and Representative posts wins.)	Result	Ref
1994	Barangay Captain; Talamban, Cebu City	Nonpartisan (Note: Barangay officials are required by Philippine law to be independent of national and local political parties. In practice, however, it is common for barangay-level alliances to be affiliated with local parties in their respective cities or municipalities.)		—N/a		—N/a	—N/a	—N/a	—N/a	—N/a	Lost	
1995	City Councilor; Cebu City—1st	BOPK	Lakas-CMD	—N/a		—N/a	—N/a	—N/a	—N/a	—N/a	Won	
1998	City Councilor; Cebu City—1st	BOPK	LAMMP	—N/a		—N/a	—N/a	—N/a	—N/a	9th	Lost	
2001	City Councilor; Cebu City—1st	BOPK	PROMDI	—N/a		—N/a	—N/a	—N/a	—N/a	—N/a	Won	
2004	City Councilor; Cebu City—1st	BOPK	Lakas-CMD	—N/a		82,203	—N/a	—N/a	—N/a	2nd	Won	
2007	City Councilor; Cebu City—1st	BOPK	Lakas-CMD	—N/a		100,049	—N/a	—N/a	—N/a	2nd	Won	
2010	Term-limited as city councilor, did not run											
2013	City Councilor; Cebu City—1st	BOPK	Liberal	—N/a		106,135	8.35%	—N/a	2.26%	1st	Won	
2016	Vice Mayor; Cebu City	BOPK	Liberal	Edgardo Labella (Incumbent)	BARUG	222,337	46.85%	—N/a	-6.30%	2nd	Lost	
2019	City Councilor; Cebu City—1st	BOPK	LDP	—N/a		124,466	8.55%	—N/a	2.12%	1st	Won	
2022	City Councilor; Cebu City—1st	BOPK	LDP	—N/a		125,485	7.21%	-1.34%	1.99%	1st	Won	
2025	Mayor; Cebu City	BOPK	Liberal	Raymond Alvin Garcia (Incumbent)	KUSUG	209,370	43.86%	—N/a	13.56%	1st	Won	

== Personal life ==
Archival has two sons, Nathan and Nestor Jr. He is the eldest of four siblings, including Talamban Barangay Councilor Nelson and Noel, a lawyer and human rights defender who was murdered in 2014. His niece, Noel's daughter and then-first ranked Talamban Sangguniang Kabataan (SK) Councilor Nyza "Nice" Archival, was elected as the second-highest ranking city councilor for Cebu City's 1st District in 2025.

In 2009, Archival suffered a stroke at the age of 51, alongside complications from hypertension and diabetes. Following his recovery, he adopted a healthier lifestyle, which later influenced his decision to establish Toniq Juice Bar as a business venture.

== Honors and awards ==
Archival is a recipient of the following awards:

- Ten Most Outstanding Councilors of the Philippines, awarded by Senator Edgardo Angara, JCI Philippines, and the Philippine Councilors League, March 2010;
- Ten Most Outstanding Cebuanos, awarded by the Tingog sa Lungsod Program & Cebu Breakfast Club, August 2010;
- People’s Choice Awards for the Search for Modern Day Heroes 2012, awarded by Pitong Pinoy and Yahoo! Inc., Sep. 2012;
- Plaque of Recognition from the Joint Climate Change and Advocacy Program, given by DENR-7 and PIA-7, December 2014;
- Outstanding Professional of the Year, awarded by the Professional Regulation Commission (PRC), June 2018;
- Most Outstanding Electrical Engineer in the Field of Construction / Project Management, awarded by the Institute of Integrated Electrical Engineers of the Philippines.

== See also ==
- List of people from Cebu
- Mayor of Cebu City
- Cebu City Council

Political offices
Preceded by Raymond Alvin Garcia	Minority Floor Leader of the Cebu City Council; 2019 — June 30, 2025	Succeeded by Sisinio Andales
Preceded by Raymond Alvin Garcia	29th Mayor of Cebu City; June 30, 2025 — Present	Incumbent
Preceded by Junard Chan	Chairperson of the Region VII; Regional Peace and Order Council (RPOC-7); November 6, 2025 — Present	Incumbent
Party political offices
Preceded by Joy Augustus Young; 2013	Vice mayoral candidate of Bando Osmeña – Pundok Kauswagan; 2016	Succeeded by Mary Ann de los Santos; 2019
Preceded by Margot Osmeña; 2022	Mayoral candidate of Bando Osmeña – Pundok Kauswagan; 2025	Most recent
