= Junard Chan =

Filipino politician

Junard "Ahong" Chan
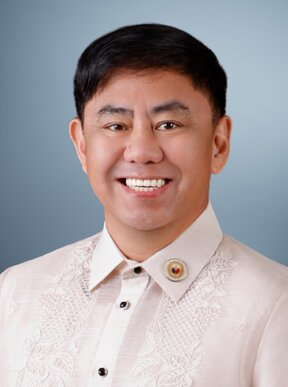
- Official portrait, 2025

Member of the House of Representatives from Lapu-Lapu's Lone District
- Incumbent
- Assumed office June 30, 2025
- Preceded by: Cynthia Chan

Mayor of Lapu-Lapu City
- In office June 30, 2019 – June 30, 2025
- Vice Mayor: Celedonio Sitoy
- Preceded by: Paz Radaza
- Succeeded by: Cynthia Chan

Barangay Captain of Pajo, Lapu-Lapu City
- In office November 30, 2013 – June 30, 2019

Member of the Lapu-Lapu City Council
- In office June 30, 2007 – June 30, 2010

Personal details
- Born: Junard Quirante Chan; September 8, 1968 Lapu-Lapu City, Cebu, Philippines
- Party: PFP (2024–present); Tribu Kusgano (local party; 2018–present)
- Other political affiliations: PDP–Laban (2018–2024); NPC (2009–2018); Lakas (2007–2009)
- Spouse: Cynthia Chan
- Children: Junard Cedric Chan Jasmine Chan

Junard "Ahong" Quirante Chan (born September 8, 1968) is a Filipino politician from Lapu-Lapu City, Philippines. He served as the mayor of Lapu-Lapu City from 2019 to 2025. Chan previously served as barangay captain of Pajo, Lapu-Lapu City from 2013 to 2019 and as a member of the City Council from 2007 to 2010.

Amid the COVID-19 pandemic, Chan tested positive for COVID-19 on June 11 although he was asymptomatic at the time of confirmation.

== Developments in Lapu-Lapu city ==
Ahong Chan has signed so far:

- Memorandum of understanding regarding development of monorail in Lapu-Lapu City.
- Approval for 203-hectare reclamation project in Lapu-Lapu City

=== Controversies ===
In October 2024, Chan filed five cyber libel cases against vlogger Humphrey Elvira, who earlier filed a failed plunder complaint against Chan. As Facebook page “Kamatuoran sa Opon ” administrator, she is also a respondent in five libel lawsuits filed by Canjulao Barangay Captain Rufo Bering and City Hall official, Louie De los Santos.
