= N8 highway =

Road in the Philippines

Route 8

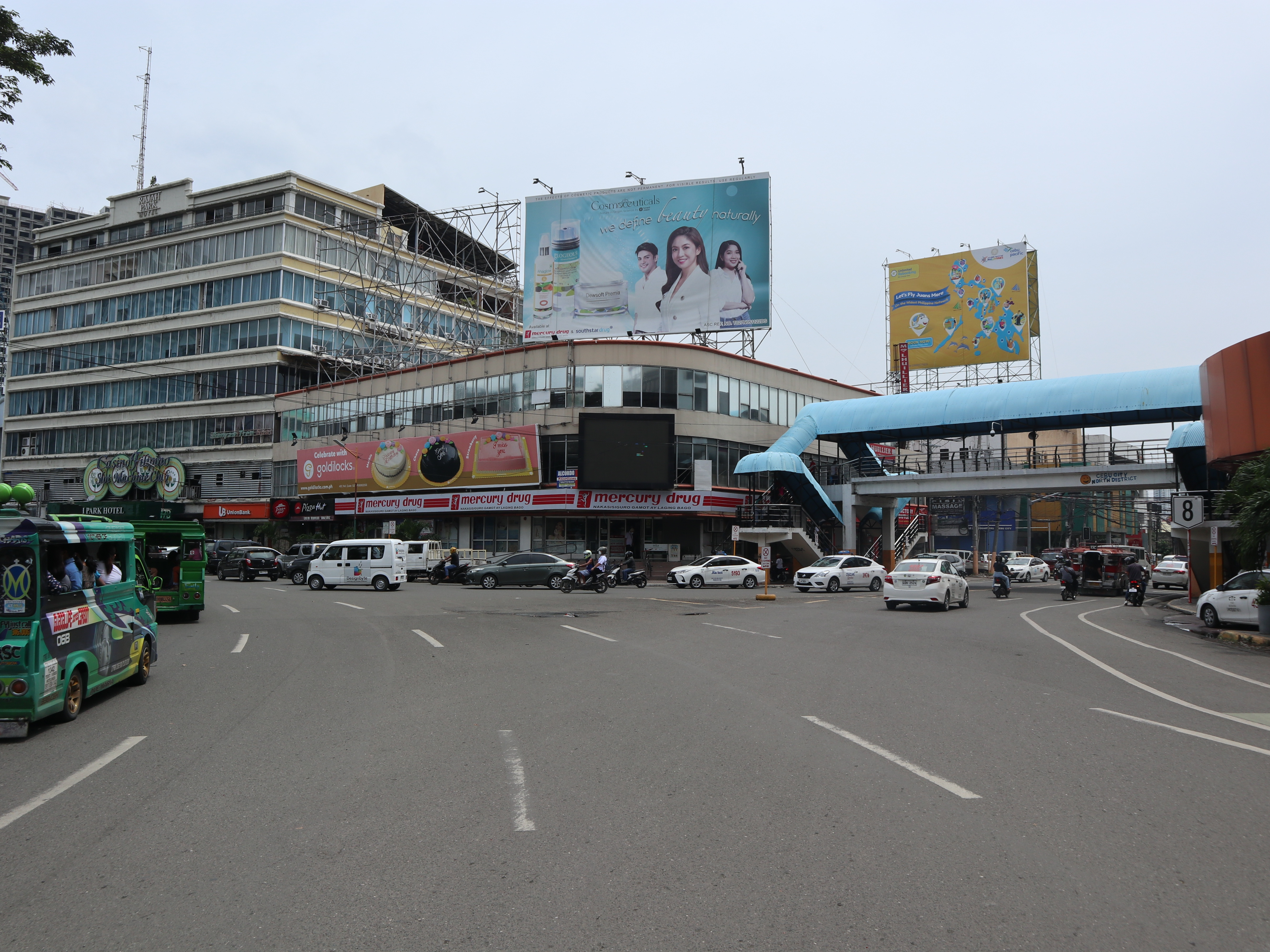
- Cebu South Road (Osmeña Boulevard) corner Cebu North Road (General Maxilom Avenue) in Cebu City along with an N8 reassurance marker

Route information
- Maintained by the Department of Public Works and Highways (DPWH)
- Length: 174 km (108 mi)

Major junctions
- North end: N810 (Cebu North Road) in Danao
- Metro Cebu Expressway in Danao; N840 (S.A. Lauron Avenue / Cansaga–Tayud Road) in Liloan; N841 (United Nations Avenue) in Mandaue; N82 (A.C. Cortes Avenue) in Mandaue; N815 (Pope John Paul II Avenue / Juan Luna Avenue) in Cebu; N825 (Rafael Rabaya Street / Toledo–Tabunok Road) in Talisay; N840 (Cebu South Coastal Road) in Talisay; N81 (Naga–Toledo Road) in Naga; N83 (Carcar–Barili Road) in Carcar
- South end: N830 (Natalio Bacalso Avenue) in Santander–Samboan boundary

Location
- Country: Philippines
- Provinces: Cebu
- Major cities: Danao, Mandaue, Cebu, Talisay, Naga, Carcar
- Towns: Compostela, Liloan, Consolacion, Minglanilla, San Fernando, Sibonga, Argao, Dalaguete, Alcoy, Boljoon, Oslob, Santander

Highway system
- Roads in the Philippines; Highways; Expressways; List
← N7	→ N9

National Route 8 (N8) is a 174-kilometer (108 mi) north-south major primary national route that forms part of the Philippine highway network in the province of Cebu. There are two highways that make up the road: the Cebu North Road and Natalio Bacalso Avenue (also known as the Cebu South Road). It runs from Danao to Santander. The highway also forms part of the Philippine Nautical Highway System, particularly the Central Nautical Highway from Danao to Cebu City and Western Nautical Highway from Cebu City to Santander.

== History ==
The highways of N8 were possibly constructed during the American period. The route's direct predecessor is Cebu Island's Highway 1 that existed during the 20th century.

Around 2014–2017 national routes were added, two roads (Cebu North Road; Cebu City to Danao and Natalio Bacalso Avenue; Cebu City to Santander) assigned as National Route 8 (N8) by the Department of Public Works and Highways.

== Route description ==
=== Danao to Cebu City ===
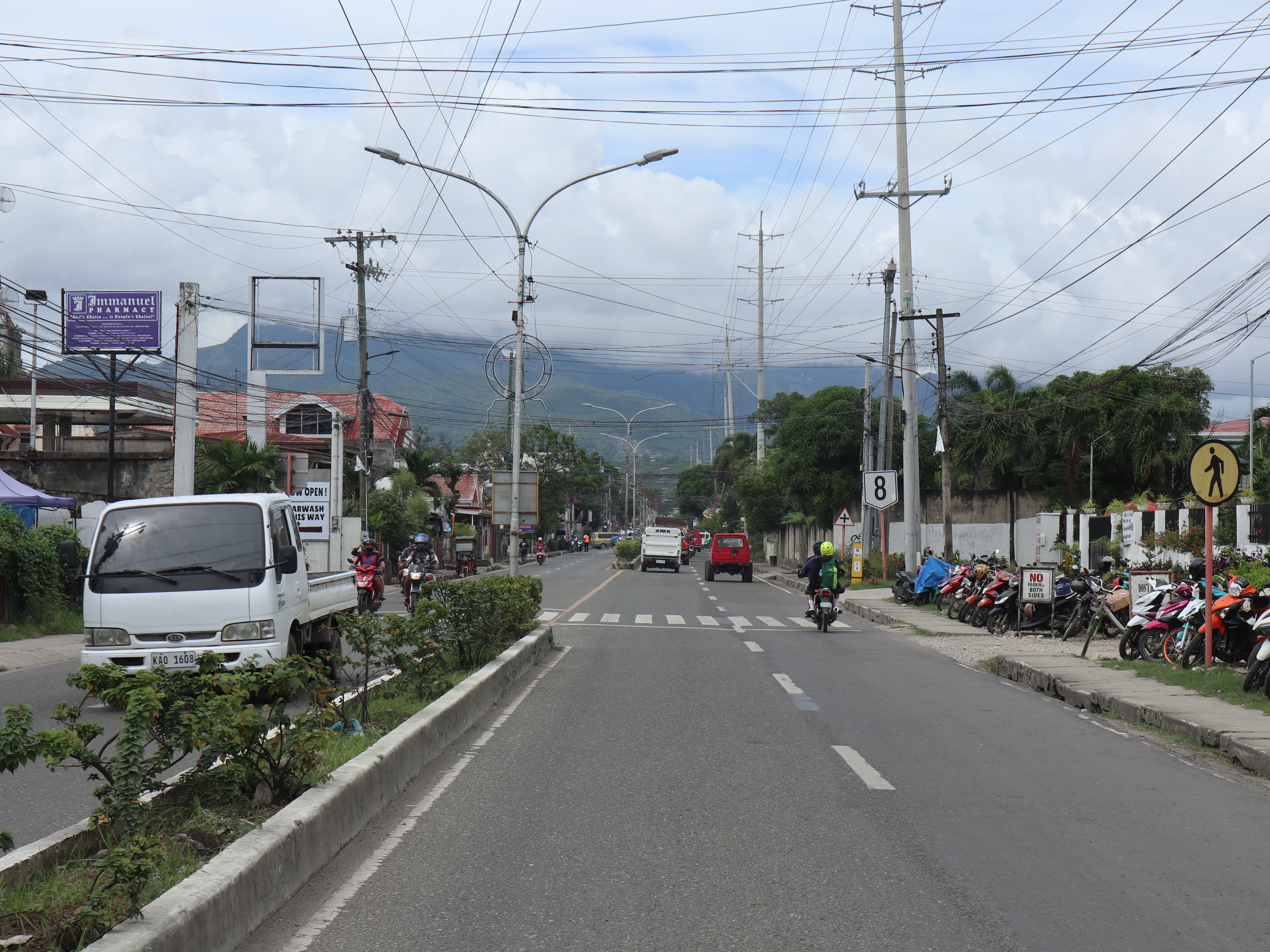
N8 as Cebu North Road in Danao

N8 begins at Cebu North Road at the route transitioning from the more rural N810 in Danao. It then passes the future terminus of the Metro Cebu Expressway. The route then traverses the towns of Compostela and Liloan, where it veers away from the eastern coast of Cebu towards Consolacion and Mandaue. In Mandaue, it is locally known as M.C. Briones Street and Lopez-Jaena Street. It then enters Cebu City, locally known as M.J. Cuenco Avenue.

=== Cebu City ===
In Cebu City, the route turns northwest at a junction from M.J. Cuenco Avenue to General Maxilom Avenue. Cebu North Road continues east of the Fuente Osmeña Circle, shortly reaching the Cebu Provincial Capitol and kilometer 0. The southern portion of N8 starts west of the circle as Natalio Bacalso Avenue, with this section being part of the Osmeña Boulevard. The kilometer count branches off from the roundabout/Cebu North Road, on a direction opposite to it. After another junction, the boulevard becomes a tertiary route, turning N8 eastward as P. Del Rosario Street, this time being a six-lane divided highway. This section and the rest of Natalio Bacalso Avenue is alternatively called the Cebu South Road.

=== Cebu City to Santander ===
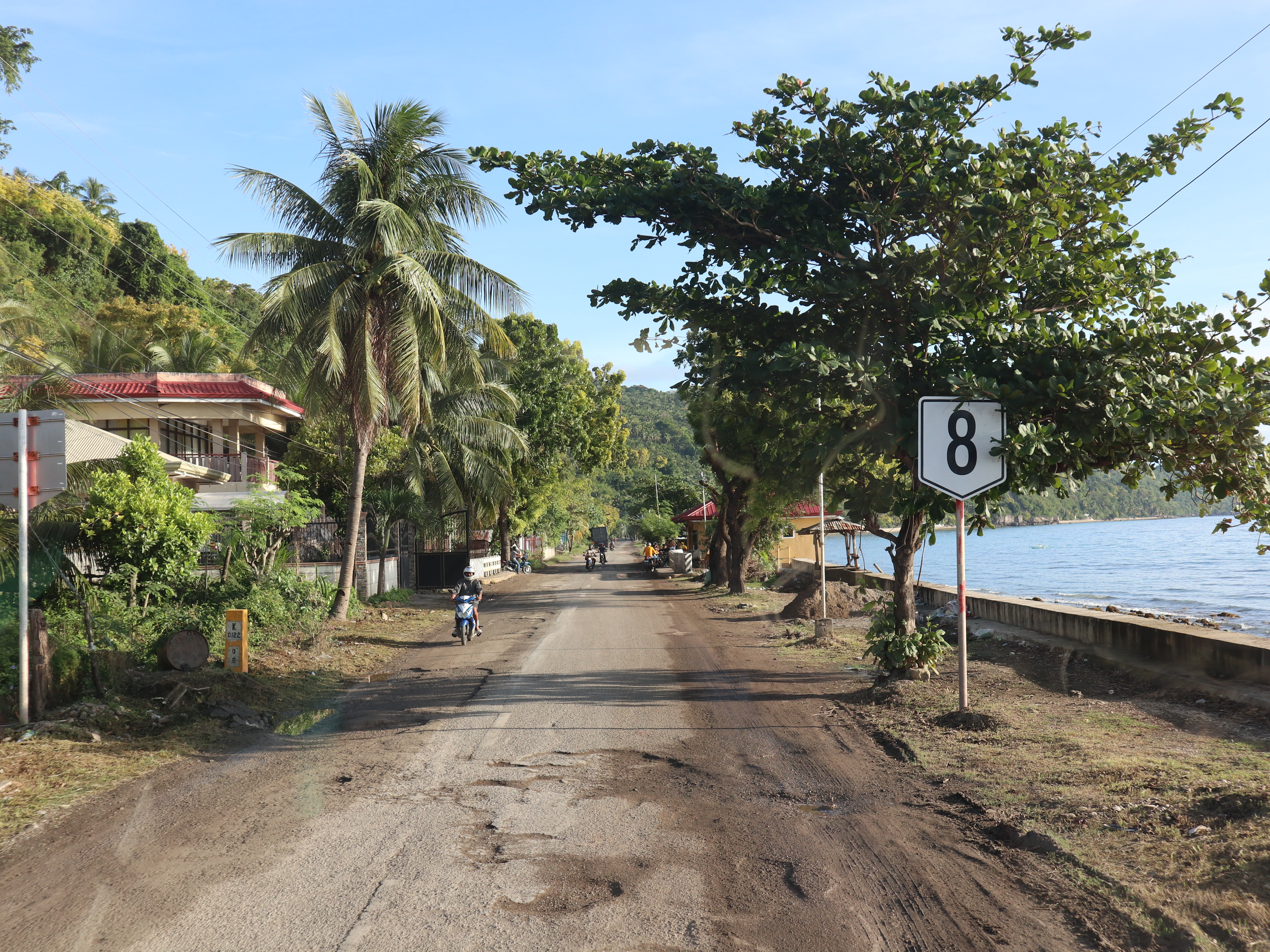
N8 as Natalio Bacalso Avenue in Oslob

The route continues as Natalio Bacalso Avenue, traversing the southeastern coastal communities of Talisay, Minglanilla, Naga, San Fernando. After reaching Carcar, the route ends up in the Carcar City Circle, where east of it is Carcar–Barili Road (N83). The route becomes more rural as it traverses through the coastal municipalities of Sibonga, Argao, Dalaguete, Alcoy, Boljoon, Oslob, Santander, and Samboan. In Samboan, it terminates at its transition with N830.

== Intersections ==
Intersections are numbered by kilometer posts, with Cebu Provincial Capitol in Cebu City designated as kilometer 0.

Province	City/Municipality	km	mi	Destinations	Notes
Cebu	Danao	33	21	N810 (Cebu North Road)	Northern terminus from a route change.
Cebu	Danao	32	20	Metro Cebu Expressway	Under construction. Serves as a major metropolitan diversion route upon completion.
Cebu	Liloan	18	11	N840 (S.A. Lauron Avenue/Cansaga–Tayud Road)	Serves as diversion road.
Mandaue				Canduman–Cebu North Road	
Mandaue		8	5.0	N841 (United Nations Avenue)	
Mandaue		7	4.3	N82 (A.C. Cortes Avenue) / M.L. Quezon Avenue	
Mandaue				A.S. Fortuna Avenue	
Mandaue				M. Logarta Road / Hernan Cortes Avenue	
Cebu City		3	1.9	N815 (Juan Luna Avenue/Pope John Paul II Avenue)	
Cebu City				N8 (Fuente Osmeña Road)	Northern terminus of Cebu South Road west of the road. Cebu North Road continues east and ends in the Provincial Capitol.
Cebu City		0	0.0	N. Escario Street	Kilometer zero. Southern terminus of Cebu North Road.
Cebu City				Kilometer count reverses	
Cebu City				Osmeña Boulevard	N8 is passed to P. Del Rosario Street
Cebu City				Vincent Rama–Tres de Abril Street	
Cebu City				C. Padilla Street	
Cebu City				Cebu Circumferential Road (Katipunan Street)	
Bulacao River				Bulacao Bridge I and II	
Cebu	Talisay	9	5.6	N825 (Rafael Rabaya Street/Toledo–Tabunok Road)	
Cebu	Talisay	11	6.8	N840 (Cebu South Coastal Road)	Serves as diversion road.
Cebu	Naga	21	13	N81 (Naga–Toledo Road)	
Cebu	Carcar			Carcar–Aloguinsan Road	
Cebu	Carcar	39	24	N83 (Carcar–Barili Road)	roundabout
Cebu	Sibonga			Sibonga–Dumanjug Road	
Cebu	Argao			Argao–Moalboal Road – Moalboal	
Cebu	Dalaguete			Dalaguete–Mantalongon–Badian Road – Badian	
Cebu	Santander–Samboan boundary	141	88	N830 (Natalio Bacalso Avenue)	Southern terminus in a route change.
1.000 mi = 1.609 km; 1.000 km = 0.621 mi: Route transition; Unopened

== See also ==
- Philippine highway network
- Cebu North Road
- Natalio Bacalso Avenue
- Osmeña Boulevard
