= Natalio Bacalso Avenue =

Highway in Cebu, Philippines

Natalio Bacalso Avenue
- Cebu South Road; Cebu South Expressway
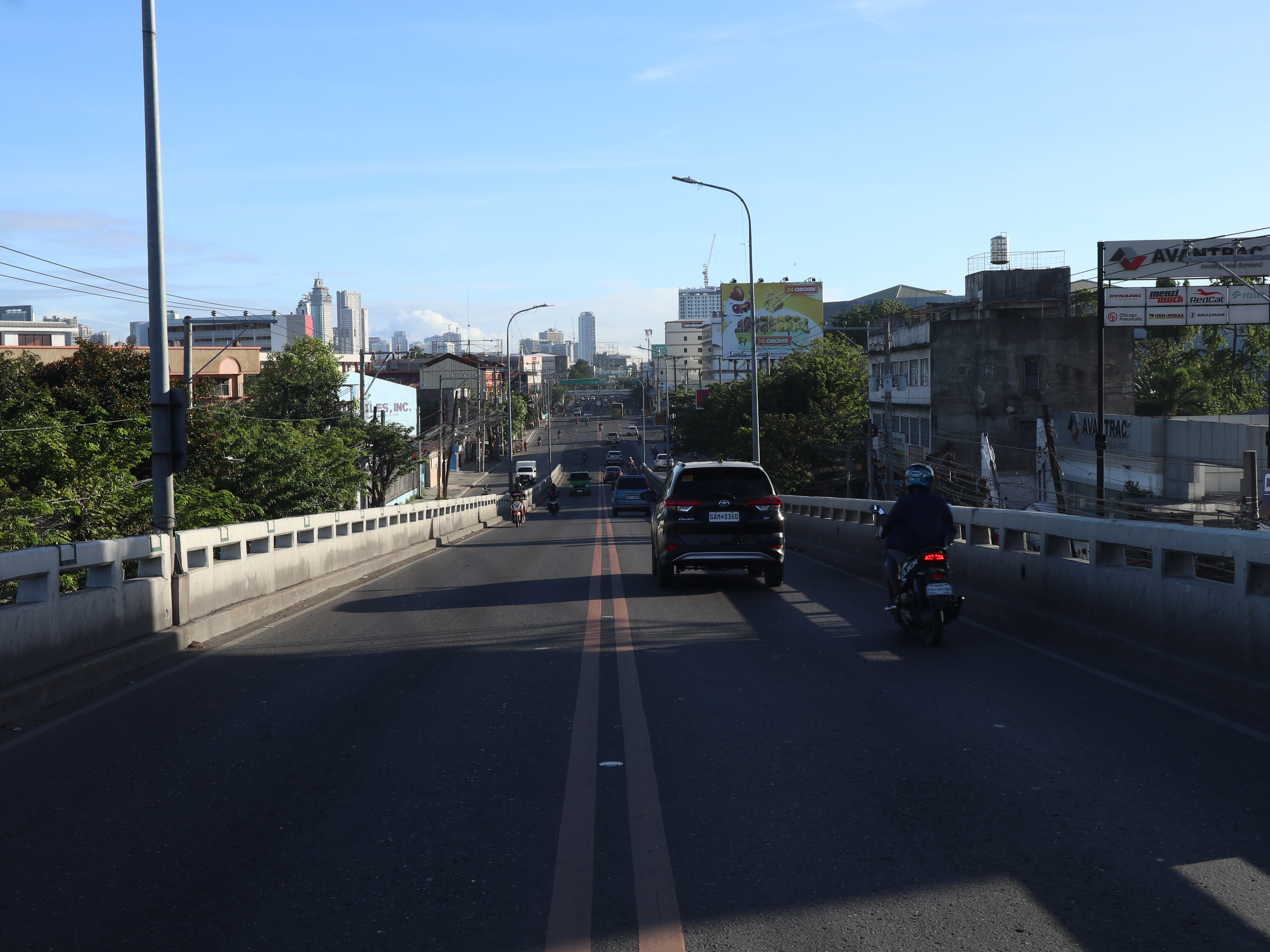
- Mambaling Flyover in Cebu City

Route information
- Maintained by the Department of Public Works and Highways
- Length: 141.356 km (87.835 mi)
- Component highways: N8 from Cebu City to Santander; N830 in Samboan

Major junctions
- From: N8 (Cebu North Road) in Cebu City
- N825 (Rafael Rabaya Street) in Talisay; N840 (Cebu South Coastal Road) in Talisay; N81 (Naga–Uling Road) in Naga; N83 (Carcar–Barili Road) in Carcar
- To: N830 (Santander–Barili–Toledo Road) in Samboan

Location
- Country: Philippines
- Provinces: Cebu
- Major cities: Cebu City, Talisay, Naga, Carcar
- Towns: Minglanilla, San Fernando, Sibonga, Argao, Dalaguete, Alcoy, Boljoon, Oslob, Santander, Samboan

Highway system
- Roads in the Philippines; Highways; Expressways; List

Natalio Bacalso Avenue, also known as Cebu South Road and informally as Cebu South Expressway, is a highway from Cebu to Samboan in Cebu, Philippines. It is currently Cebu's longest road, stretching around 140 kilometers (87 mi). It is named after Natalio Bacalso, a Cebuano writer.

The road is a component of National Route 8 (N8) and of National Route 830 (N830) of the Philippine highway network. It also forms part of the Western Nautical Highway of the Philippine Nautical Highway System.

== Route description ==
True to its old name Cebu South Road, it connects the capital Cebu City to the southern cities and municipalities of Cebu province. Natalio Bacalso Avenue refers to the entire Cebu South Road, according to the Department of Public Works and Highways. However, according to Batas Pambansa Blg. 648, it is the legal name of its section from Leon Kilat Street, Cebu City to Santander only.

=== Cebu City ===
The avenue starts in Cebu City at the Fuente Osmeña Circle, its intersection with Cebu North Road, in Cebu City as Osmeña Boulevard. It then turns west at its intersection with P. Del Rosario Street, transitioning to assume such name. Shortly, it intersects J. Alcantara and Leon Kilat Streets and becomes legally known as Natalio Bacalso Avenue. Mambaling Flyover carries traffic over the busy intersection in Barangay Mambaling.

=== Talisay to Santander ===
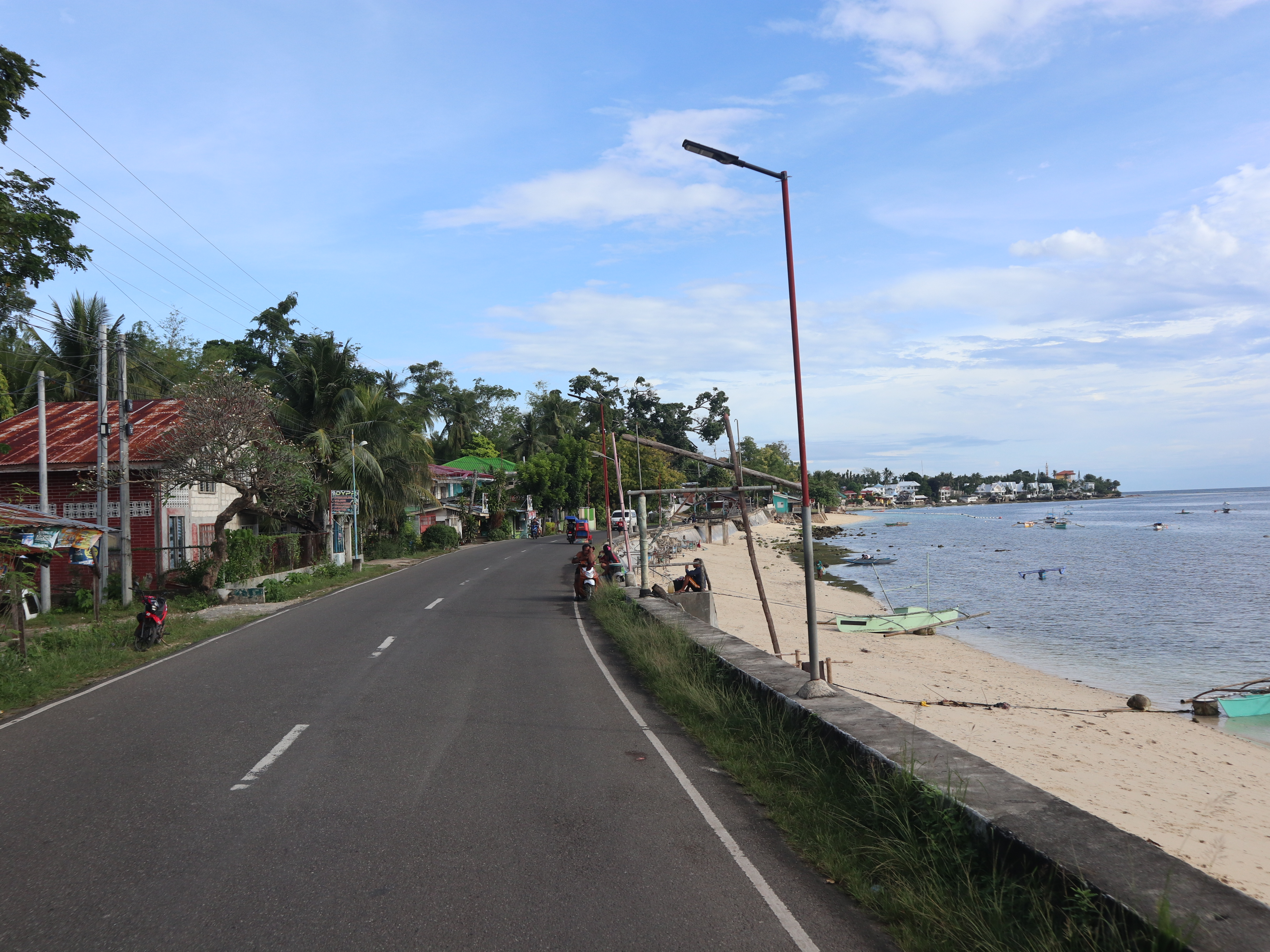
Natalio Bacalso Avenue near Tingko Beach in Alcoy

The avenue then proceeds to the city of Talisay and follows the eastern coast of Cebu. At its intersection with Rafael Rabaya Street (N825; Cebu–Toledo Wharf Road), crossing traffic is carried by the Tabunok Flyover. It then traverses Minglanilla, Naga, San Fernando, Carcar, Sibonga, Argao, Dalaguete, Alcoy, Boljoon, Oslob, and Santander. In Santander, it continues to follow Cebu's southern and southwestern coast.

=== Samboan ===
The avenue's route transitions from N8 to N830 at the Santander–Samboan municipal boundary. It proceeds into Samboan for 625 meters (2,051 ft) in Barangay San Sebastian until it is continued by Santander–Barili–Toledo Road.

== History ==
Cebu South Road historically forms part of Cebu Island's Highway 1 or Route 1 during the 20th century. On July 30, 1973, the section of the road as Cebu South Expressway from Leon Kilat Street to Barangay Mambaling in Cebu City was renamed to Rizal Avenue, after one of the Philippine national heroes, Dr. José Rizal, by virtue of Cebu City Ordinance No. 834. On March 7, 1984, the ordinance was superseded when the road's section from Leon Kilat Street, Cebu City to Santander was officially renamed to Natalio B. Bacalso South National Highway, after Cebuano writer Natalio Bacalso.
