= Cebu Trans-Axial Expressway =

Route information
- Length: 300 km (190 mi)

Major junctions
- From: Daanbantayan
- To: Santander

Location
- Country: Philippines

Highway system
- Roads in the Philippines; Highways; Expressways; List

The Cebu Trans-Axial Expressway was a proposed 4-lane, 300-kilometer, limited-access toll expressway in the Philippines. When completed, it would be the Philippines' longest expressway, more than three times longer than the Subic–Clark–Tarlac Expressway (SCTEX). It could also decongest most of Cebu island's coastal roads and protect its coastal areas from unexpected exploits.

The expressway will initially have two lanes, one for each direction. As soon as these lanes become operational, another carriageway will be built.

The government will finance the construction, but upon completion, the operation and maintenance of toll facilities will be offered to the private sector through concession. As of 2026, no updates were made.

== See also ==
- Metro Cebu Expressway, the current incarnation of the expressway proposal to bypass traffic in the metropolis.
