= N830 highway =

Road in Cebu, Philippines

Route 830

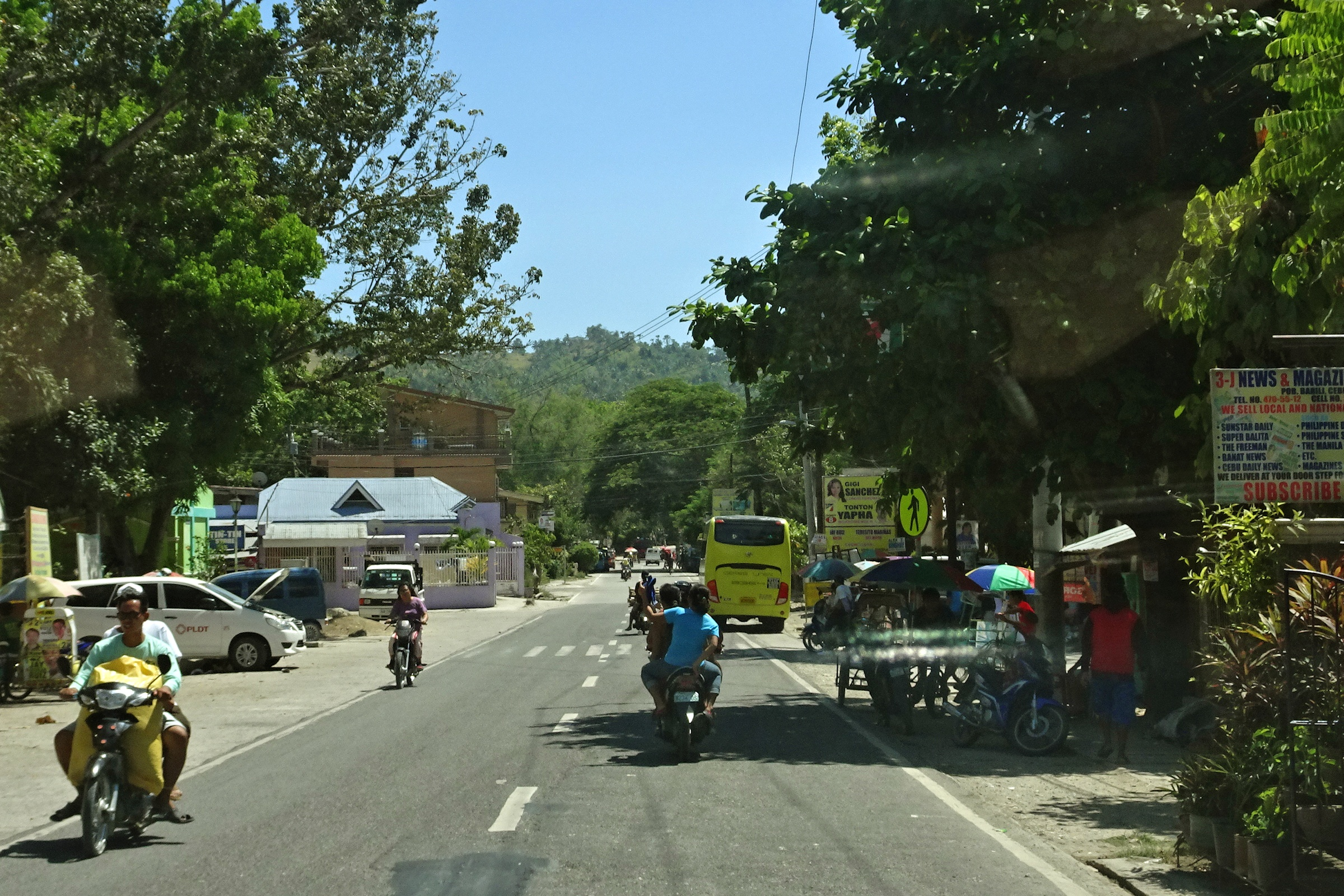
- Santander–Barili–Toledo Road, a component of N830 in Barili

Route information
- Maintained by Department of Public Works and Highways (DPWH)
- Length: 95 km (59 mi)

Major junctions
- South end: N8 (Natalio Bacalso Avenue) in Samboan
- North end: N81 (Toledo–Pinamungahan–Alonguinsan–Mantalongon Road) / N83 (Carcar–Barili Road) in Barili

Location
- Country: Philippines
- Provinces: Cebu
- Towns: Samboan, Ginatilan, Malabuyoc, Alegria, Badian, Moalboal, Alcantara, Ronda, Dumanjug, Barili

Highway system
- Roads in the Philippines; Highways; Expressways; List
← N826	→ N840

National Route 830 (N830) is a secondary route that forms part of the Philippine highway network from Samboan to Barili in Cebu, Philippines. There are four components of the route, namely Natalio Bacalso Avenue (in Samboan), Santander–Barili–Toledo Road, Carcar–Barili Road and Carcar–Barili–Mantalongon Road.

== Route description ==
The route starts as Natalio Bacalso Avenue (Cebu South Road) from a route change from National Route 8 (N8) at the Santander–Samboan boundary. Shortly, the road is changed to Santander–Barili–Toledo Road. It then traverses the western coastal municipalities of Ginatilan, Malabuyoc, Alegria, Badian, Moalboal, Alcantara, Ronda, Dumanjug, and Barili.

In Barili, it veers to the east away from Cebu's western coast towards the city proper, where it transitions as Carcar–Barili Road at its intersection with Felix Paras Street in poblacion. The route then meets its northern end at the intersection with Toledo–Pinamungahan–Alonguinsan–Mantalongon Road in Barangay Mantalongon.

== History ==
The predecessors of N830 are Highway 301 from Samboan to Barili and Highway 918 in Barili that existed during the 20th century.

During the addition of National Routes by the Department of Public Works and Highways in 2014, the roads Natalio Bacalso Avenue (in Santander), Santander—Barili–Toledo Road, Carcar–Barili Road and Carcar–Barili–Mantapuyan Road were designated components of N830.
