= N83 =

N83 may refer to:

- Carcar–Barili Road, in the Philippines
- HMS Cachalot (N83), a submarine of the Royal Navy
- London Buses route N83
- N83 road (Ireland)
