= N81 highway =

Road in the Philippines

Route 81

Route information
- Maintained by the Department of Public Works and Highways (DPWH)
- Length: 71 km (44 mi)

Major junctions
- East end: N8 (Natalio Bacalso Avenue) in Naga
- Metro Cebu Expressway in Naga; N825 (Lutopan Road/Toledo–Tabunok Road) in Toledo; N820 (Toledo–Tabuelan–San Remigio Road) in Toledo; N826 (Rafols Street/Toledo Wharf Road – Toledo Port) in Toledo
- West end: N83 (Carcar–Barili Road) / N830 in Barili

Location
- Country: Philippines
- Major cities: Naga, Toledo
- Towns: Pinamungahan, Aloguinsan, Barili

Highway system
- Roads in the Philippines; Highways; Expressways; List
← N80	→ N82

National Route 81 (N81) is a 71-kilometer (44 mi), east-west primary route which forms part of the Philippine highway network in Cebu connecting the cities and municipalities of Naga, Toledo, Pinamungahan, Aloguinsan and Barili.

== History ==
The direct predecessors of N81 were Highway 337 from Naga to Toledo, Highway 317 from Pinamungahan to Aloguinsan, and Highway 313 in Barili. When the modern highway routes were assigned in 2014, the segment of Cebu−Toledo Wharf Road from Barangay Lutopan to Poblacion except Toledo Port and Naga−Uling Road was assigned as N81. Around 2022, the route expanded when the Toledo–Pinamungahan–Aloguinsan–Mantalongon Road became part of N81 as it was signed as a secondary road (N820).

== Route Description ==
=== Naga to Uling ===
N81 begins as the Naga–Uling Road in Naga from its junction with the Naga–Uling Road (N8). The route then makes a junction with the southern terminus of the under-construction Metro Cebu Expressway. After reaching Toledo it meets its end in the Cebu–Toledo Wharf Road (N825) in a Y-junction. After the junction, N81 is transferred to this road.

=== Uling to Toledo Wharf ===
After the Naga–Uling Road junction, N81 is assigned to Cebu–Toledo Wharf Road, succeeding its previous route N825. The road exits the mountainous part of Toledo and enters its poblacion. Cebu–Toledo Wharf Road becomes part of N826 and ends in the port of Toledo and N81 is reassigned.

=== Toledo Wharf to Mantalongon ===
After Cebu–Toledo Wharf Road becomes a port road designated as N826, the number is assigned to Toledo–Pinamungahan–Aloguinsan–Mantalongon Road. It traverses the eponymous towns of Pinamungahan and Aloguinsan, eventually reaching the barangay of Mantalongon in Barili. N81 ends there in a three-way junction with the N83 and N830 portions of the Carcar–Barili Road.

== Intersections ==
The entire route is located in Cebu. Intersections are numbered by kilometer posts, with Cebu Provincial Capitol designated as kilometer 0.

City/Municipality	km	mi	Destinations	Notes
Naga	21.840	13.571	N8 (Natalio Bacalso Avenue)	Eastern terminus.
Naga			Metro Cebu Expressway	Under construction.
Toledo	42.203	26.224	N825 (Cebu–Toledo Wharf Road)	End of Naga–Uling Road section, N81 is transferred to this road from N825.
Toledo			N820 (Toledo–Tabuelan–San Remigio Road)	
Toledo			N826 (Cebu–Toledo Wharf Road) – Port of Toledo	Route changes to N826 as a port road, N81 continues as Toledo–Pinamungahan–Aloguinsan–Mantalongon Road.
Pinamungahan			Pinamungahan Cadre Road	
Aloguinsan	79.660	49.498	Tapal–Zaragoza–Olango–Aloguinsan Road – Carcar	
Barili	87.712	54.502	N83 (Carcar–Barili Road) / N830	Western terminus.
1.000 mi = 1.609 km; 1.000 km = 0.621 mi: Route transition; Unopened
