= Osmeña Boulevard =

Major road in Cebu City, Philippines

Osmeña Boulevard
- Jones Avenue
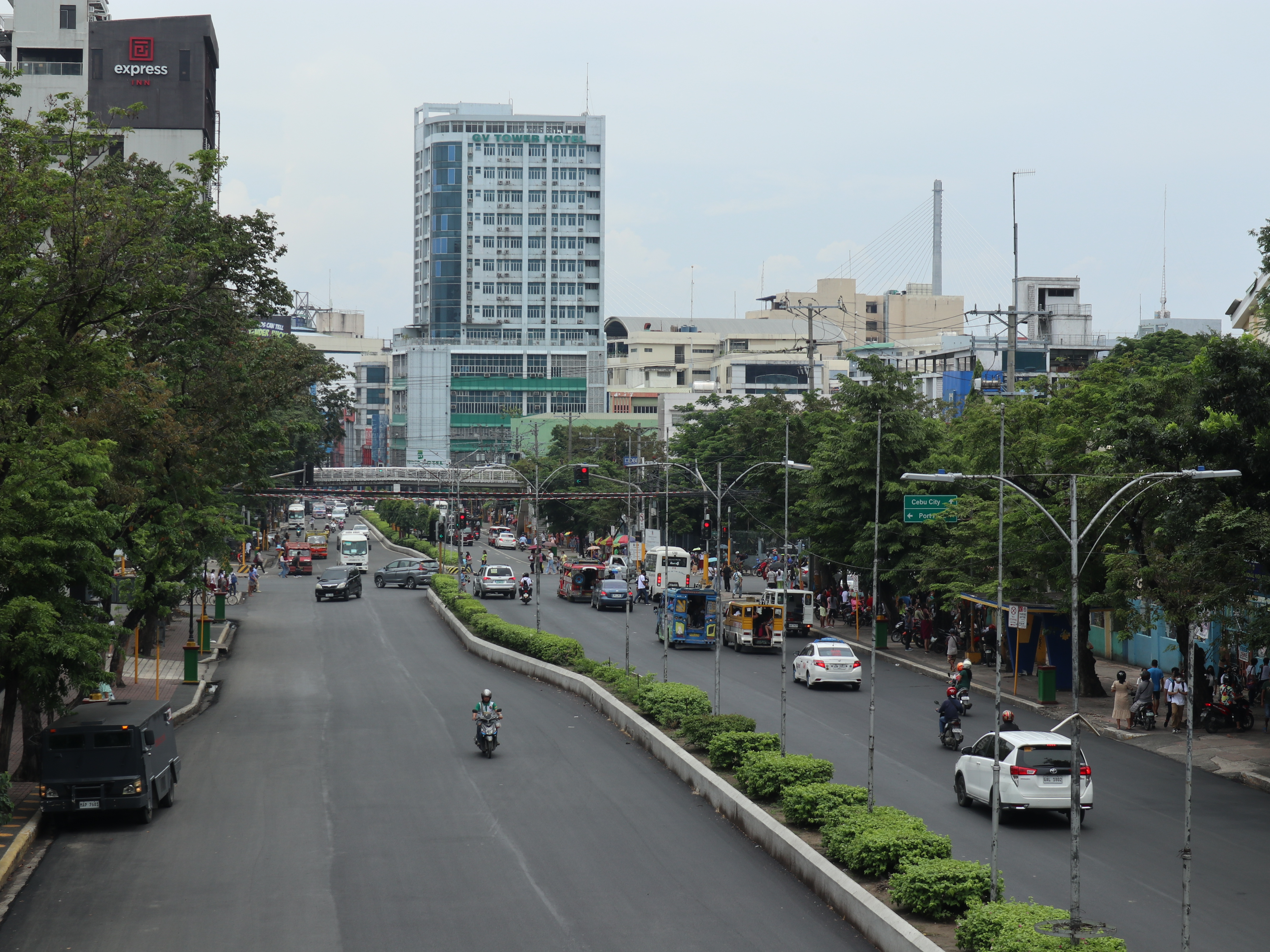
- Osmeña Boulevard southbound to Colon

Route information
- Length: 3.2 km (2.0 mi)
- Component highways: N8 from San Antonio to Capitol Site

Major junctions
- From: M.J. Cuenco Avenue in San Roque
- Colon Street; N8 (Natalio Bacalso Avenue); N8 (Gen. Maxilom Avenue) / Buenaventura Rodriguez Street
- To: N. Escario Street in Capitol Site

Location
- Country: Philippines
- Major cities: Cebu City

Highway system
- Roads in the Philippines; Highways; Expressways; List

Osmeña Boulevard is a major arterial thoroughfare in Cebu City, Philippines. It is the city's "main street" which travels in a generally northwest–southeast orientation linking the old downtown district of San Roque near the harbor with the modern uptown Capitol Site district. Beginning at M.J. Cuenco Avenue in the east, the boulevard heads northwest towards Fuente Osmeña circle and ends at Escario Street. At its north end, the Cebu Provincial Capitol serves as a prominent terminating vista. It is the location of many of Cebu's notable institutions such as the Cebu Normal University, Abellana National School and Cebu Doctors' University Hospital; the Basilica of Santo Niño; one of the city's tallest buildings, Crown Regency Hotel; and shopping centers Robinsons Fuente and Gaisano Colon.

== History ==
Osmeña Boulevard was developed during the American period to connect the old Spanish colonial town of Cebu to outlying areas being opened up by the American government as its new city. It was formerly named Jones Avenue, after American congressman William Atkinson Jones who sponsored Jones Law or Philippine Autonomy Law of 1916. It was renamed Doña Pepang Avenue on March 29, 1960 by virtue of City Ordinance No. 284, in honor of Sergio Osmeña's first wife Estefania Veloso Osmeña, who died in 1918 at a mansion and estate that they owned along the boulevard. It also historically formed part of Cebu Island's Highway 1 or Route 1 during the 20th century. An ordinance in 1978 then reinforced a change to the present Osmeña Boulevard.

== Route description ==
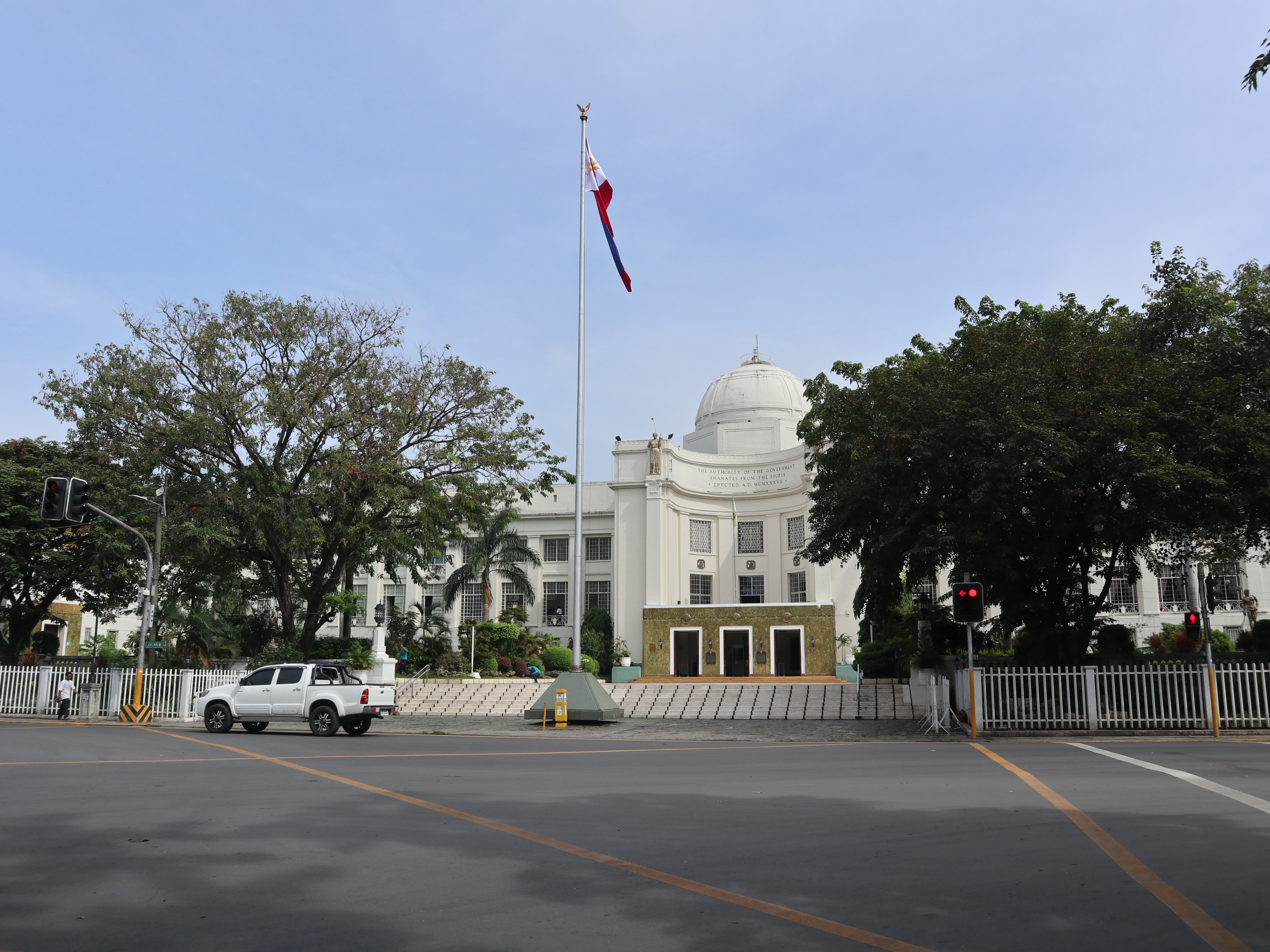
Cebu Provincial Capitol located at the northern end of Osmeña Boulevard

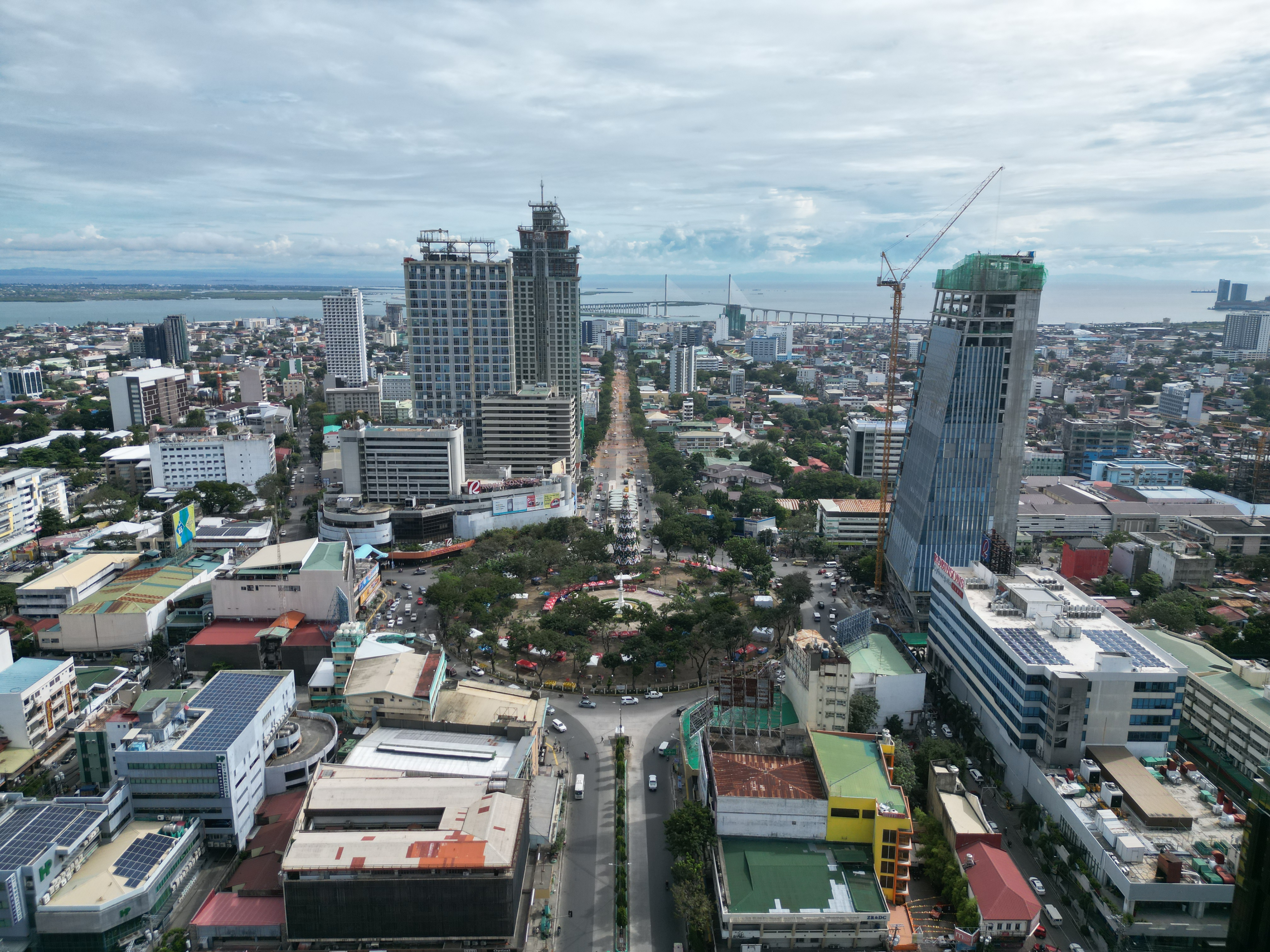
Fuente Osmeña roundabout where Osmeña Boulevard meets General Maxilom Avenue

Osmeña Boulevard begins as a four-lane undivided road at the intersection with M.J. Cuenco Avenue near Plaza Independencia, San Roque area. The road goes for 0.8 kilometers (0.50 mi) west through Pari-an and Kalubihan passing narrow streets and the Basilica of Santo Niño until it turns north at Colon Street, the city's old shopping district. At Sanciangko Street just past the University of Cebu main campus, the boulevard divides slightly and becomes three lanes each way. It intersects with Natalio Bacalso Avenue and traverses Santa Cruz and Sambag passing Cebu Normal University and Abellana National School. Also in the vicinity of Natalio Bacalso and Pantaleon del Rosario Street are the University of San Carlos and Cebu City Sports Complex. The boulevard continues north towards Fuente Osmeña circle, a large roundabout with a park and fountain in the middle, where many hotels are located such as Crown Regency, Cebu Midtown Hotel and Rajah Park Hotel. Fuente Osmeña is also the location of Robinsons Fuente Cebu and Robinsons Cybergate shopping malls. The road ends right in front of the Cebu Provincial Capitol which creates a terminating vista for those looking north along the boulevard. Escario Street leads east towards Camputhaw and the Cebu Business Park. Towards the west, the boulevard connects to M. Velez Street, which leads towards Barangay Guadalupe, the largest barangay of Cebu City.

The boulevard is officially part of Cebu North Road from its northern terminus at Cebu Provincial Capitol to Fuente Osmeña and of Natalio Bacalso Avenue from Fuente Osmeña to Pantaleon del Rosario Street; the section circumscribing Fuente Osmeña is also called Fuente Osmeña. The aforementioned sections are classified as primary national roads, signed as N8 of the Philippine highway network. The remaining section of the boulevard up to M.J. Cuenco Avenue is classified as an unsigned, tertiary national road.
