= Metro Cebu Expressway =

Road in the Philippines

Route information
- Length: 73.75 km (45.83 mi)

Major junctions
- North end: N8 (Cebu North Road) in Danao
- N815 (Cebu–Balamban Transcentral Highway) in Cebu N825 (Cebu–Toledo Wharf Road) in Talisay
- South end: N81 (Naga–Toledo Road) in Naga

Location
- Country: Philippines
- Provinces: Cebu
- Major cities: Danao, Mandaue, Cebu City, Talisay, Naga
- Towns: Compostela, Liloan, Consolacion, Minglanilla

Highway system
- Roads in the Philippines; Highways; Expressways; List

The Metro Cebu Expressway (MCE) is a 74-kilometer (46 mi) expressway in Metro Cebu, Philippines. Once completed, it will connect Cebu North Road (N8) in Danao to Naga–Uling Road (N81) in Naga and will serve as an alternative north–south backbone highway for Metro Cebu.

As of 2020, only a portion of the expressway in Barangays Pangdan and Cantao-an in Naga, Cebu, part of the project's third segment, has been constructed. Its first and second segments are currently on hold until the approval of unsolicited proposals from private firms and road right-of-way acquisitions.

In July 2025, Cebu City Mayor-elect Nestor Archival urged Cebu Governor Pamela Baricuatro to fast-track the completion of the Metro Cebu Expressway. Both officials agreed to form a joint task force with DPWH to coordinate progress. The project aims to significantly reduce travel time across Metro Cebu once completed.

== See also ==
- Lapu-Lapu Expressway
