= Carcar–Barili Road =

Road in Cebu, Philippines

Carcar–Barili Road
- Carcar–Barili–Mantayupan Road

Route information
- Maintained by Department of Public Works and Highways
- Length: 20.872 km (12.969 mi)
- Component highways: N83 from Carcar to Barili; N830 in Barili

Major junctions
- East end: N8 (Natalio Bacalso Avenue) in Carcar
- N81 (Toledo–Pinamungahan–Aloguinsan–Mantalongon Road) in Barili
- West end: N830 (Santander–Barili–Toledo Road) / Felix Paras Street in Barili

Location
- Country: Philippines
- Provinces: Cebu
- Major cities: Carcar
- Towns: Barili

Highway system
- Roads in the Philippines; Highways; Expressways; List

Carcar–Barili Road is a road connecting the city and municipality of Carcar and Barili in Cebu, Philippines. The road forms a part of National Route 830 and is the only road assigned to National Route 83.

From the west, the road starts at the intersection with Felix Paras Street in the Carcar town proper as the continuation of Santander–Barili–Toledo Road. It then proceeds to the east cutting through the mountainous terrain of Cebu. Its route transitions from N83 (a primary national road) to N830 (a secondary national road) at its intersection with N81 in Barangay Mantalongon. It then enters Carcar, where it ends at the Carcar City Circle, its intersection with Natalio Bacalso Avenue at the city proper.
