= Cebu Provincial Capitol =

Provincial capitol in the Philippines

- Kapitolyo sa Sugbo
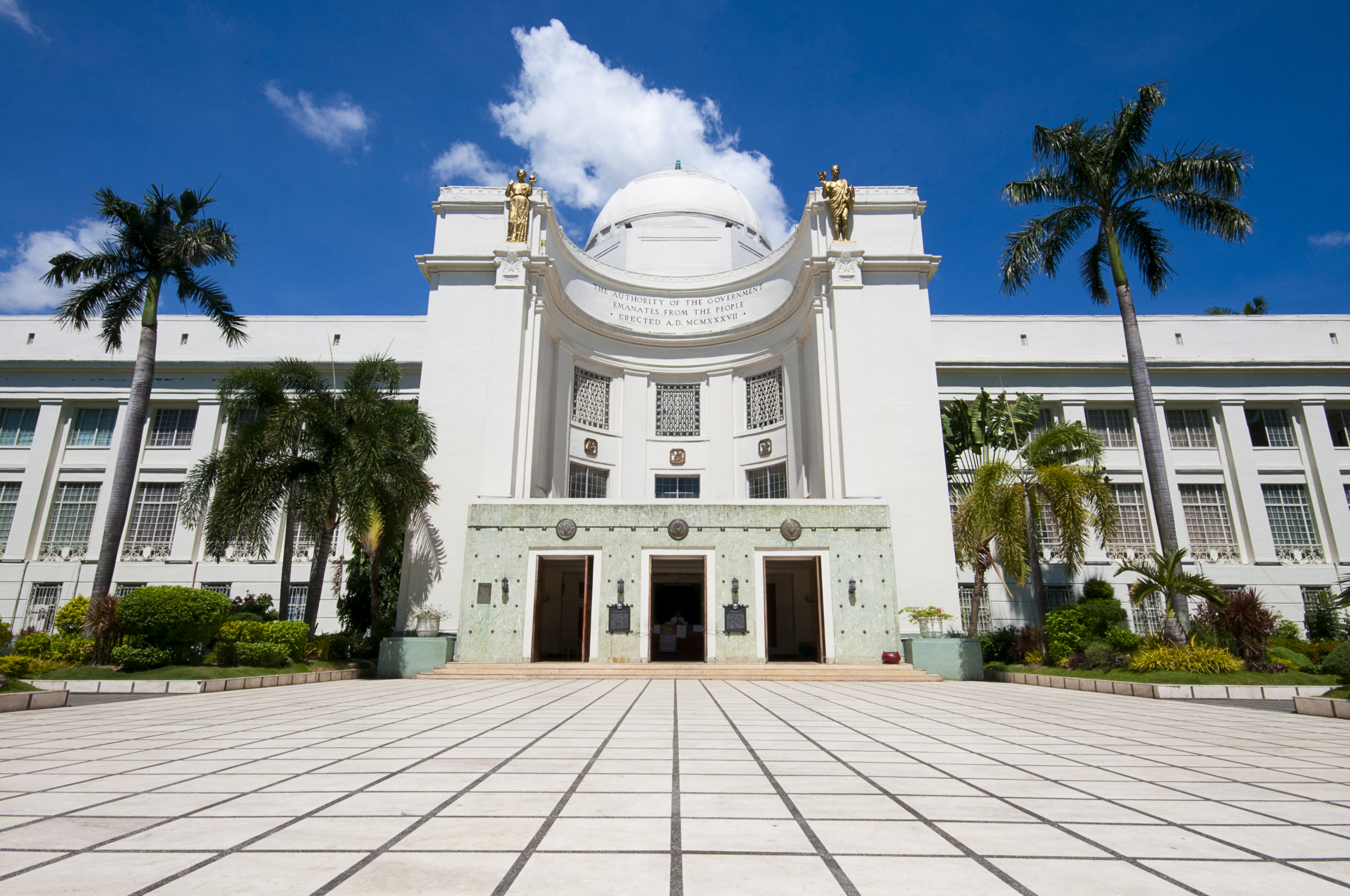
- Facade of Cebu Provincial Capitol
- Interactive map of the Cebu Provincial Capitol area

General information
- Architectural style: Neoclassicism, art deco
- Location: Cebu City, Philippines
- Coordinates: 10°19′0.11″N 123°53′26.74″E
- Current tenants: Office of the Governor; Provincial Government of Cebu
- Construction started: 1937
- Completed: 1938
- Inaugurated: June 14, 1938

Technical details
- Structural system: Reinforced concrete
- Floor count: 3 floors at the main block; 2 at the secondary wings

Design and construction
- Architect: Juan Marcos Arellano y De Guzmán (1888-1960)
- Civil engineer: Pedro Siochi y Angeles (1886-1951)
- Main contractor: the Pedro Siochi and Company

National Historical Landmarks
- Official name: Kapitolyo sa Sugbu / Kapitolyo ng Cebu
- Designated: 2008

The Cebu Provincial Capitol is the seat of the provincial government of Cebu in the Philippines. Located at the north end of Osmeña Boulevard in Cebu City, it was designed by Juan M. Arellano, a Filipino architect best known for the Manila Metropolitan Theater (1935), the Legislative Building (1926; now the National Museum of Fine Arts), and the Manila Central Post Office (1926). An inscription on the central concave portion of its façade reads, "The authority of the government emanates from the people. Erected A.D. MCMXXXVII."

It is also the same venue, which held the second inauguration of President Gloria Macapagal Arroyo in 2004.

== History ==
Planning for the capitol, which was to replace the old Casa Provincial in the city's Spanish quarter, actually started in 1910, in the day of the inauguration of Osmeña Waterworks. Sergio Osmeña, then Speaker of the Philippine Assembly, took Governor-General William Cameron Forbes to an exhibition baseball match, after which they inspected the future site of the building near Fuente Osmeña. In the book about his father E. J. Hanselma: Colonial Engineer, James Hanselma narrates the event:

Finally they went over a newly-built boulevard into the countryside to a plaza in the midst of fields empty except for a simple fountain. The site was planned as the new provincial capitol site. The fountain was to commemorate the building of the waterworks.

Construction commenced in 1937 under the supervision of the architecture firm of Pedro Siochi and Company. It took place also during the administration of Cebu Governor Sotero Cabahug who was its principal champion. It was financed through a bond approved by President Manuel L. Quezon and through public subscription. Vicente Sotto once criticized the construction of the building as a waste of public funds, and vowed to convert it to a hospital in one of his speeches. Additionally, Quezon was initially skeptical of the project because of the opposition from allies, but he supported and approved its construction.

The building was finally completed in 1938 during the term of Governor Buenaventura Rodriguez, the inauguration ceremony taking place during June 14, 1938, led by President Manuel L. Quezon, with Cebu Archbishop Gabriel Reyes blessing the new building, and the wife of Governor Rodriguez breaking the champagne bottle at the main balcony.

The Capitol was badly damaged in World War II but eventually rehabilitated through the Tydings War Damage Act of 1946.

The construction of a new capitol in Balamban, a replica of the existing Cebu City building, was started during the term of Governor Gwendolyn Garcia. However this was opposed by then-gubernatorial candidate Pam Baricuatro, who defeated Garcia in the 2025 election.

== Architecture ==
The Cebu Provincial Capitol is dramatically positioned at the end of a grand perspective of a new avenue (Osmeña Boulevard) as conceived by William E. Parsons in his 1912 plan of Cebu, in the lines of the City Beautiful Movement.

The building follows an H-shaped plan, one side opening to the terminus of Osmeña Boulevard. The main block or corps de logis, three stories high, is flanked by two secondary wings, symmetrically advancing to embrace a rectangular, elevated cour d'honneur that serves as an entrance podium. The elevation of the corps de logis is of typical neoclassical formula: a rusticated ground floor, containing minor rooms and offices, the piano nobile above, with the most important spaces, and finally the attic story. A heavy cornice and parapet caps the façade, with allegorical statues standing by its corners. The most distinctive part of the façade is the central concave pavilion, which creates the semi-circular main balcony and pulls together the entire mass, finally crowned by an austere dome upon an octagonal drum.

The piano nobile is reached by two staircases from the ground floor foyer. The first space, the art deco rotunda below the cupola, opens to the south the main balcony that faces Osmeña Boulevard, and to its north the ballroom (social hall). Two stories high with full-length windows, the ballroom, also in art deco style, is reminiscent of a fairytale setting. Two enormous chandeliers fashioned in crystal and local capiz shells (placuna placenta) light the grand space.

The building's architectural style is neoclassical in spirit, but in its severe simplification foreshadows the changing architectural language of Arellano towards the art deco style.

== Landmark ==
In 2008, it was declared as National Historical Landmark by the National Historical Commission of the Philippines.

== Gallery ==
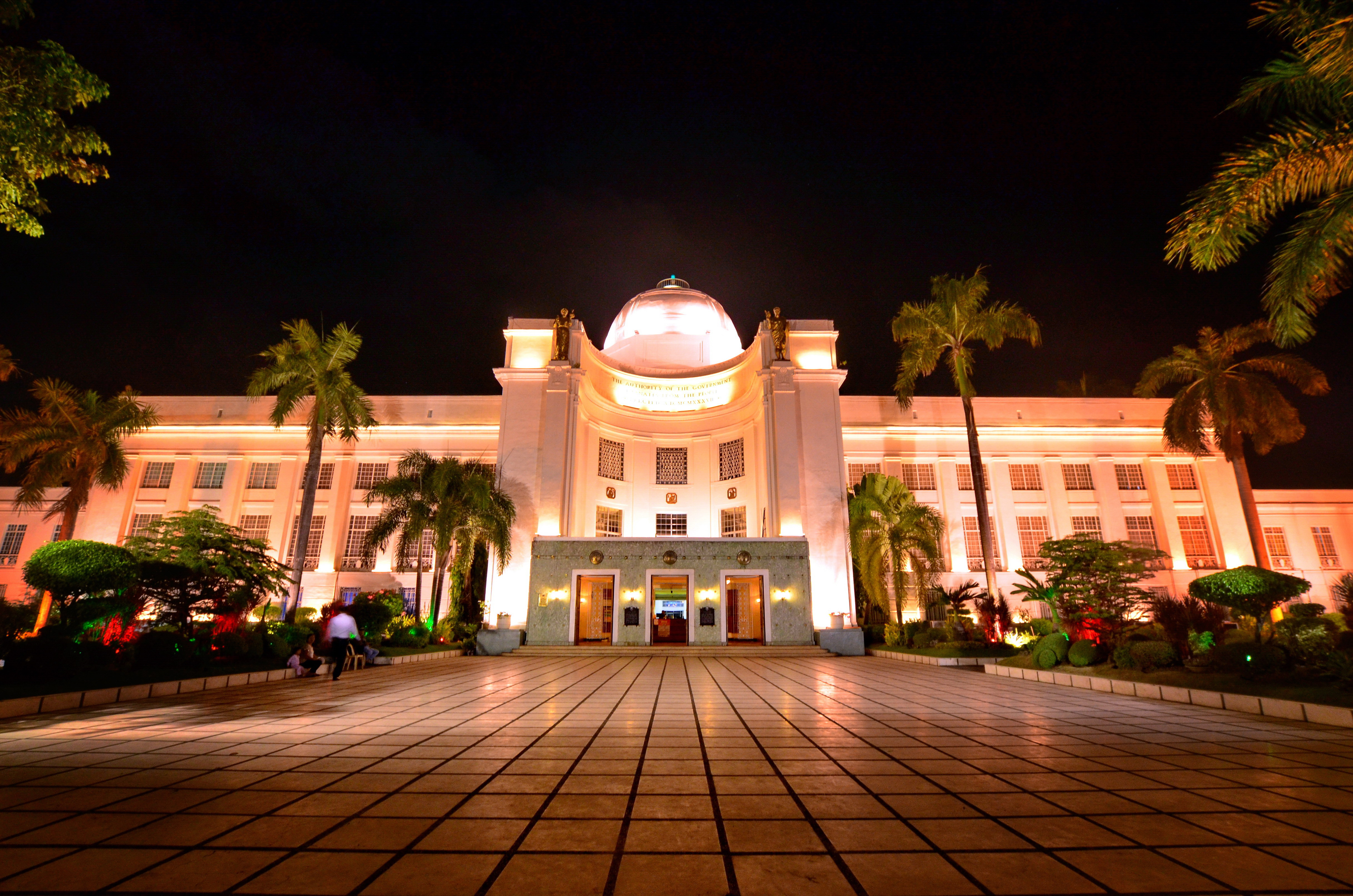
Cebu Provincial Capitol Building at night 2013.

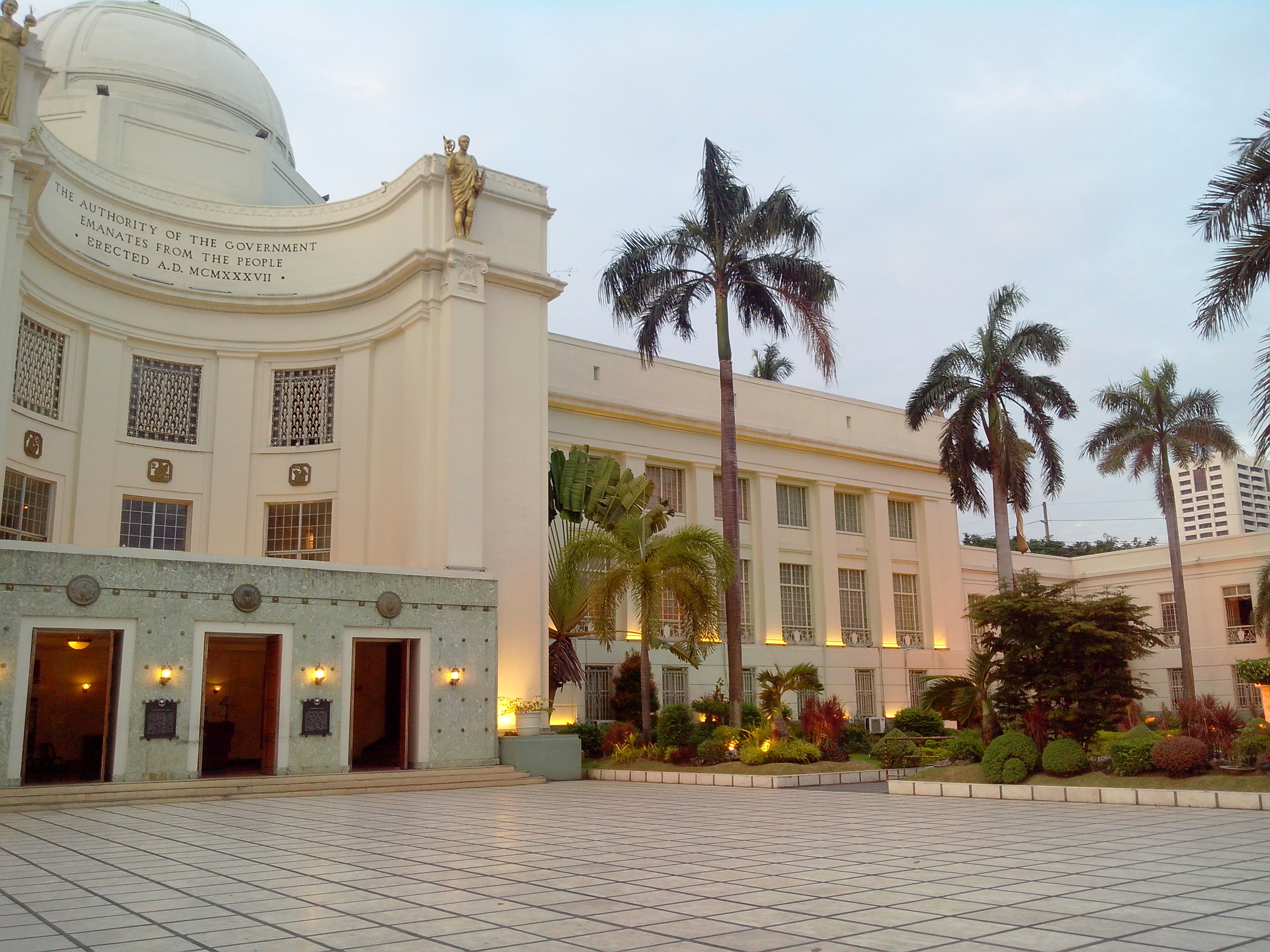
Cebu Provincial Capitol Building close up 2013

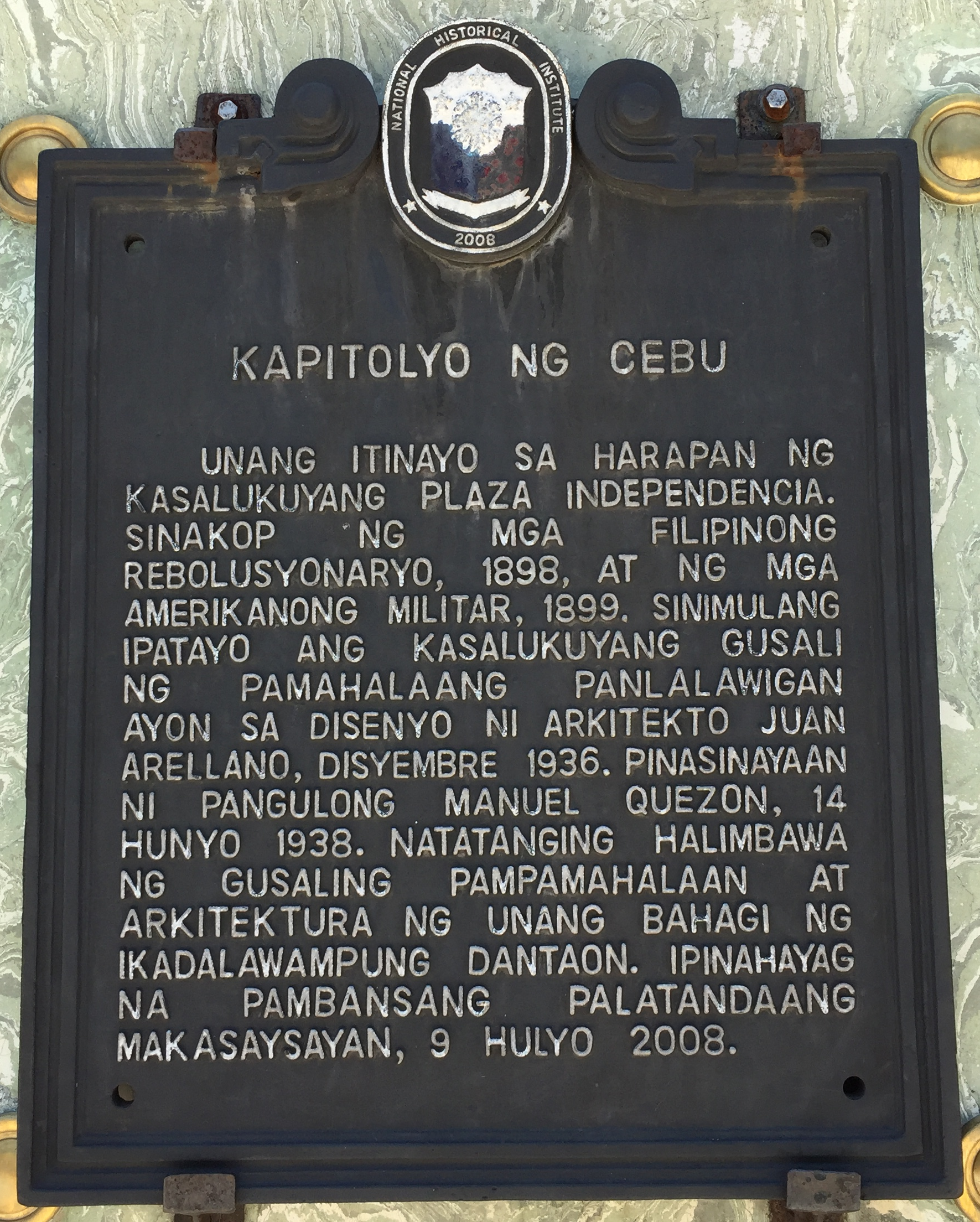
Cebu Capitol historical marker (Tagalog)

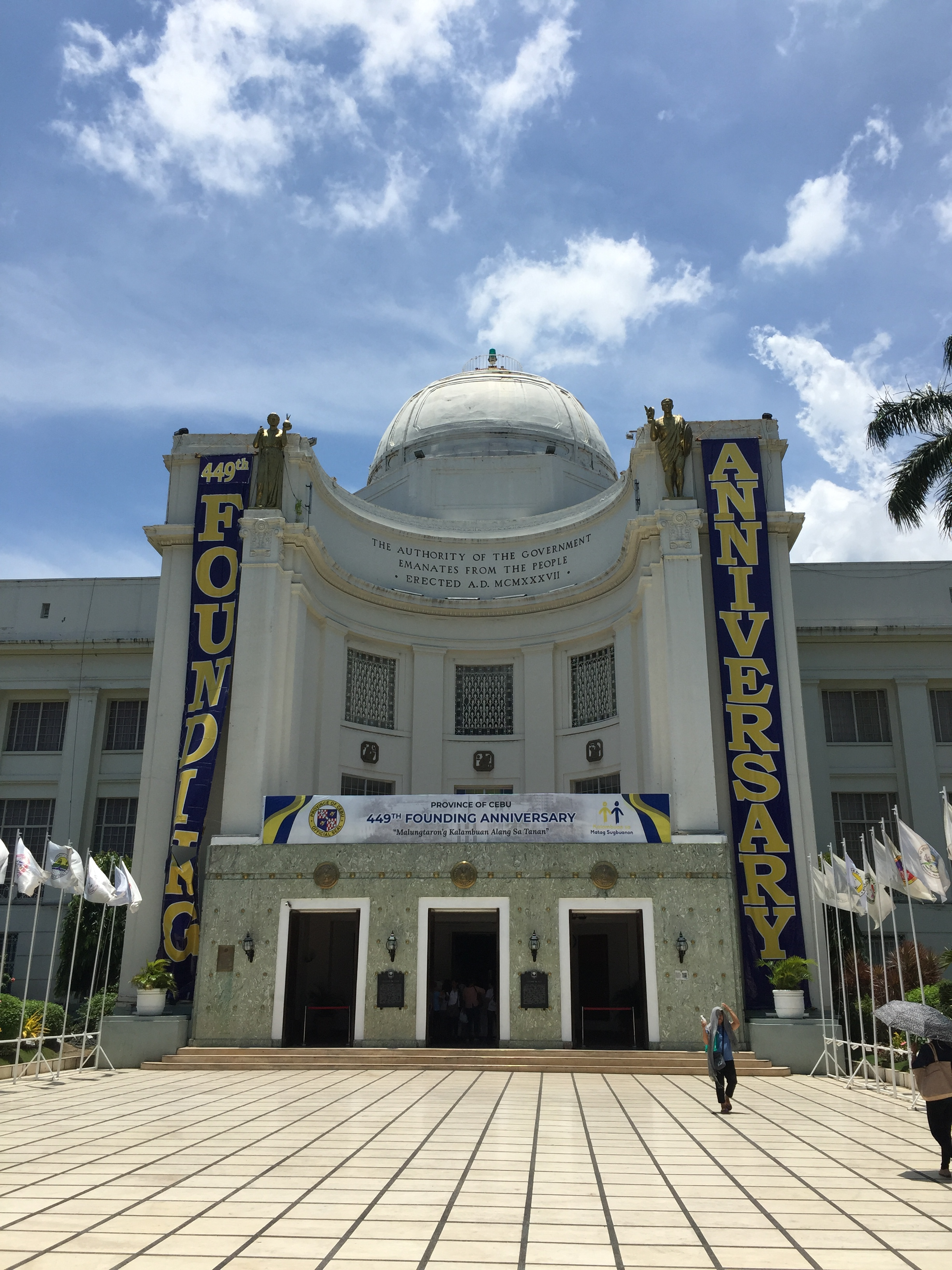
Cebu Provincial Capitol Building on the 449th Founding Anniversary in 2018

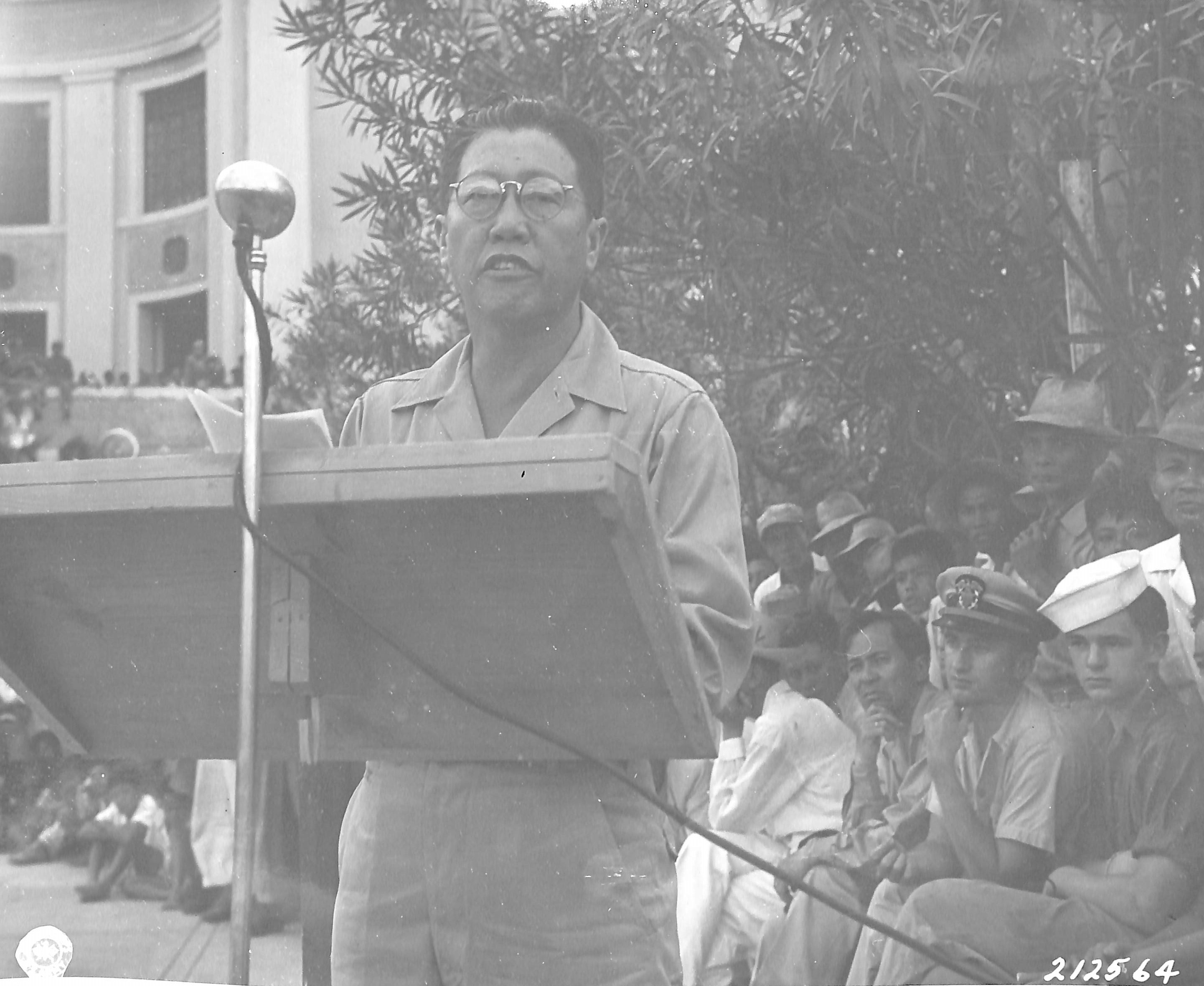
Governor of Cebu Fructuoso B. Cabahug, speaks from the steps of the Capitol Building as part of the VJ-Day Celebration. 9/9/1945
