= Samboan =

Municipality in Cebu, Philippines

Samboan Canamucan
- Municipality
- Municipality of Samboan
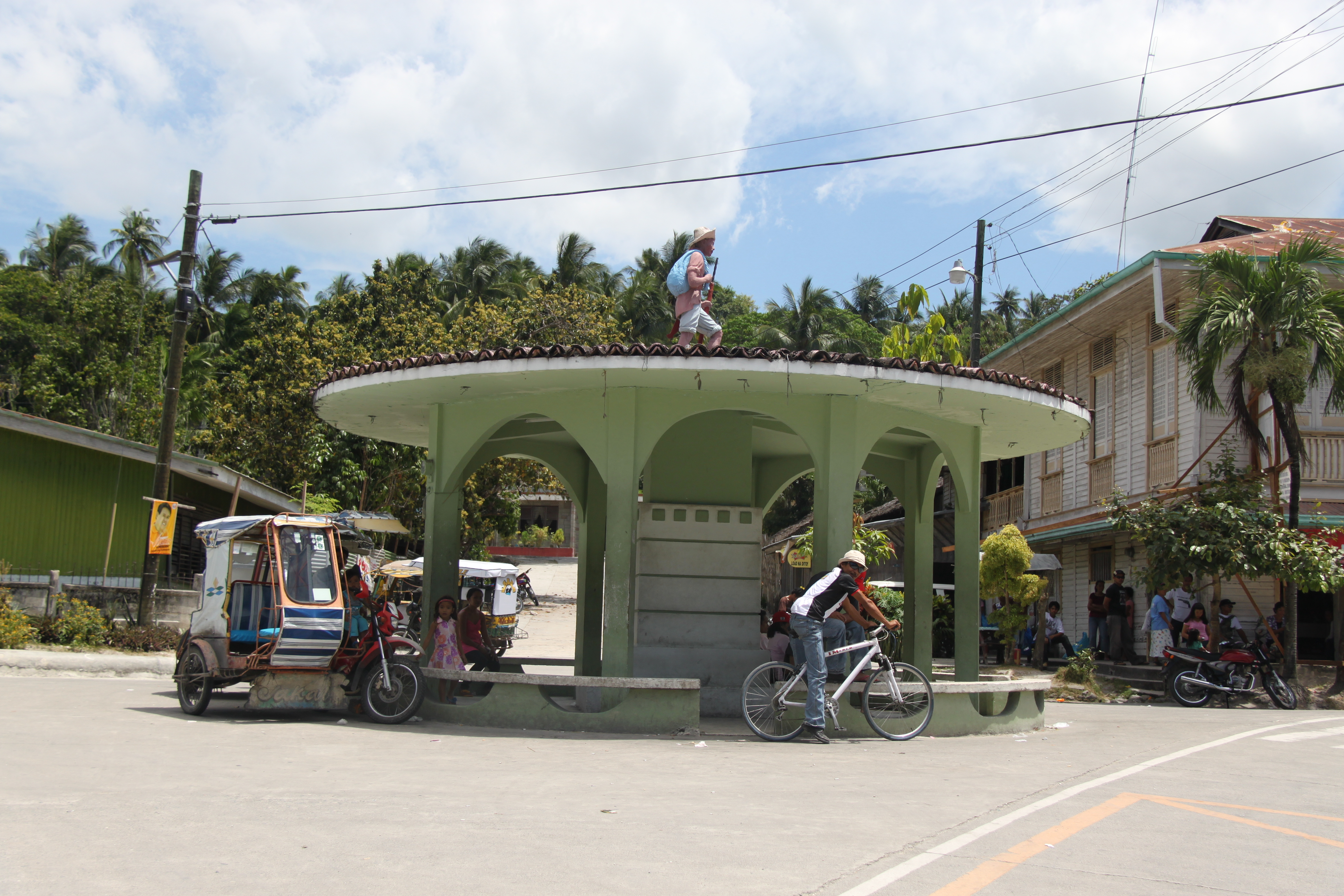
- Rotunda, Samboan

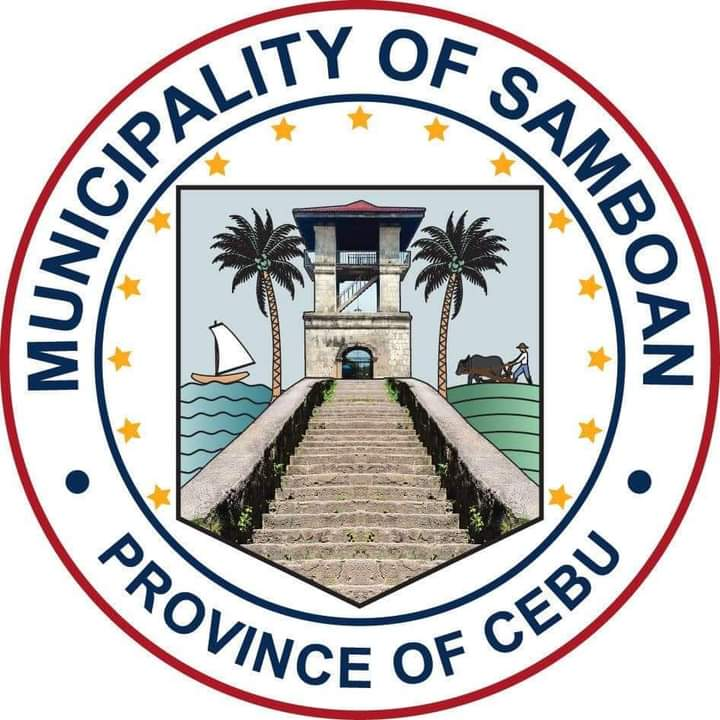
- Seal
- Etymology: Sinamboangan
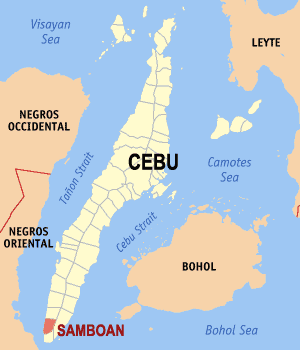
- Map of Cebu with Samboan highlighted
- Interactive map of Samboan
- Location within the Philippines
- Coordinates: 9°31′44″N 123°18′23″E
- Country: Philippines
- Region: Central Visayas
- Province: Cebu
- District: 2nd district
- Founded: 1784
- Barangays: 15 (see Barangays)

Government
  - Type: Sangguniang Bayan
  - Mayor: Emerito Emmanuel D. Calderon (1Cebu)
  - Vice Mayor: Irving P. Gamallo (1Cebu)
  - Representative: Edsel Galeos (Lakas)
  - Municipal Council: Members: Manolito D. Apelanio; Romulito D. Pielago; Marissa Jude Calderon-Alazas; Rosalina D. Bilocura; Venancio F. Gerzon, Jr.; Remedios T. Tano; Rosemarie C. Zerna; Harris N. Reyes
  - Electorate: 14,612 voters (2025)

Area
  - Total: 45.16 km^{2} (17.44 sq mi)
- Elevation: 156 m (512 ft)
- Highest elevation: 693 m (2,274 ft)
- Lowest elevation: 0 m (0 ft)

Population (2024 census)
  - Total: 20,736
  - Density: 459.2/km^{2} (1,189/sq mi)
  - Households: 4,862

Economy
  - Income class: 4th municipal income class
  - Poverty incidence: 29.08% (2023)
  - Revenue: ₱ 175.6 million (2024)
  - Assets: ₱ 547.4 million (2024)
  - Expenditure: ₱ 66.52 million (2024)
  - Liabilities: ₱ 83.03 million (2024)

Service provider
  - Electricity: Cebu 1 Electric Cooperative (CEBECO 1)
- Time zone: UTC+8 (PST)
- ZIP code: 6027
- PSGC: 072240000
- IDD : area code: +63 (0)32
- Native languages: Cebuano; Tagalog

Samboan, officially the Municipality of Samboan (Cebuano: Lungsod sa Samboan; Tagalog: Bayan ng Samboan), is a municipality in the province of Cebu, Philippines. According to the 2024 census, it has a population of 20,736 people.

== History ==
Samboan is popularly known as an abbreviation of the word sinamboang as a form of fishing during the Spanish time.

However, Samboan in our historical papers is probably known to be Canamucan which is a territory under the Spanish encomienda system of the Spanish administration during their tenure and conquest. As time goes by, Canamucan becomes Samboan in the current usage. The 1818 census showed that the tributes counted 2,496 native families and 69 Spanish-Filipino families.

Samboan is a small town on a hill. But it used to be a much bigger town, with Alegria under its territorial jurisdiction. In fact, the people of Alegria were made to render forced labor for the construction of the Samboan church. The 1818 census showed 2,496 native families and 69 Spanish-Filipino families who came from Spain.

It was only sometime during the middle of the 1880s that those two towns were separated from Samboan (the towns of Ginatilan and Malabuyoc, which now lie in between, were created after the separation).

The municipality of Samboan is one of the emerging towns in the island of Cebu. It is one of the most resilient towns of the whole Philippines ranking 6th in the whole country per ranking under the competitive index of LGUs as of the year 2017. It is also a two-time awardee for the National Seal of Good Local Governance from year 2016 and 2017. It is also a known awardee for the Child-Friendly municipality in 2016 and continues to be so at present.

== Geography ==
Samboan is bordered to the north by the town of Ginatilan, to the west is the Tañon Strait, to the east is the town of Oslob, and to the south is the town of Santander. It is located 150 kilometres (93 mi) south of Cebu City.

=== Barangays ===
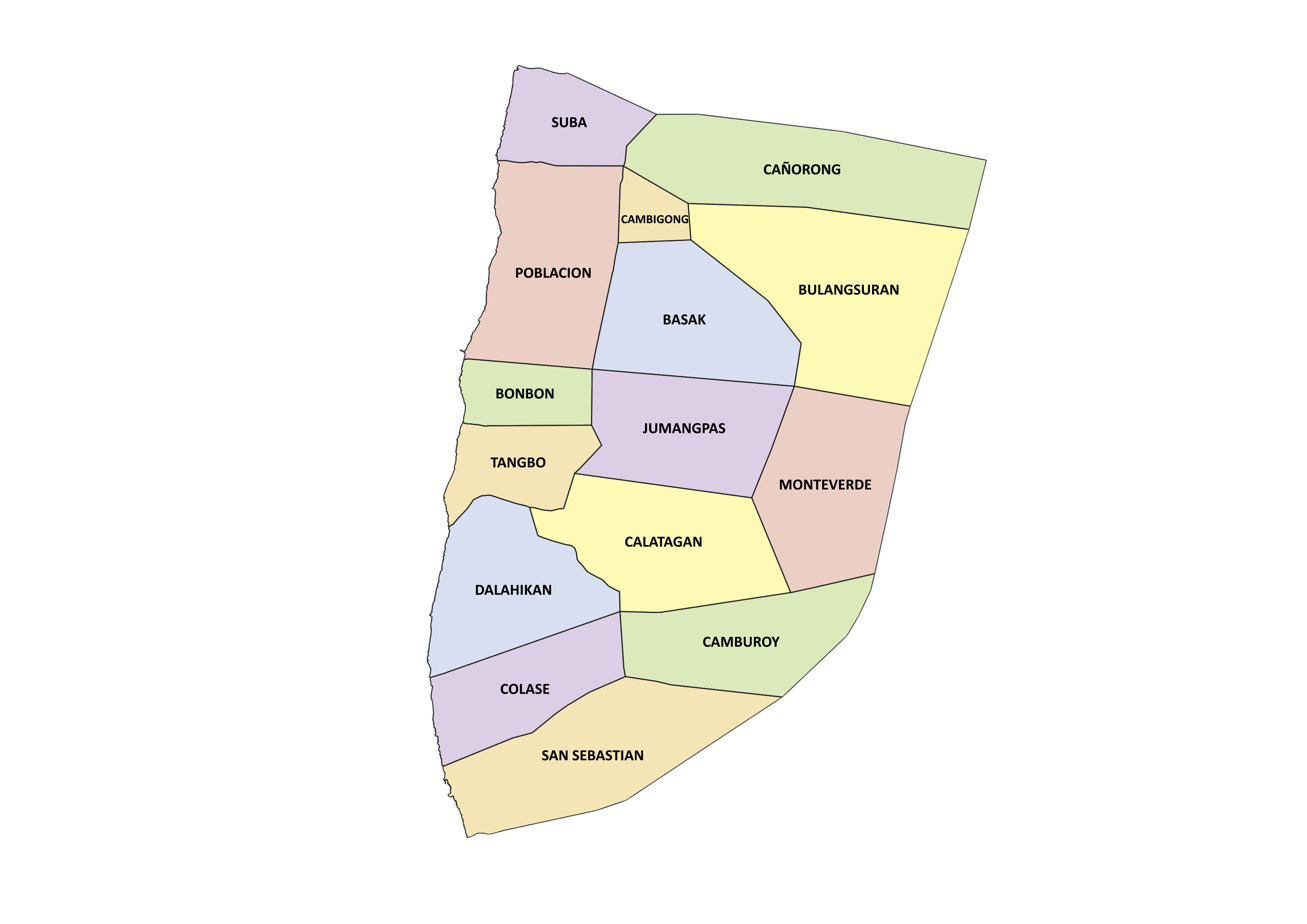
Political map of Samboan

Samboan is politically subdivided into 15 barangays. Each barangay consists of puroks and some have sitios.

PSGC	Barangay	Population			±% p.a.	
		2024		2010		
072240001	Basak	5.5%	1,141	1,027	▴	0.73%
072240002	Bonbon	3.0%	613	540	▴	0.88%
072240003	Bulangsuran	5.1%	1,054	1,099	▾	−0.29%
072240004	Calatagan	6.2%	1,284	1,126	▴	0.91%
072240005	Cambigong	4.3%	884	670	▴	1.93%
072240010	Camburoy	4.5%	941	870	▴	0.54%
072240006	Cañorong	4.6%	964	926	▴	0.28%
072240007	Colase	5.3%	1,103	968	▴	0.90%
072240008	Dalahikan	6.6%	1,360	1,185	▴	0.95%
072240009	Jumangpas	6.2%	1,290	1,400	▾	−0.56%
072240015	Monteverde	3.6%	742	702	▴	0.38%
072240011	Poblacion	18.7%	3,887	3,901	▾	−0.02%
072240012	San Sebastian (Bato)	9.9%	2,058	2,167	▾	−0.35%
072240013	Suba	9.3%	1,931	952	▴	4.99%
072240014	Tangbo	5.4%	1,121	1,080	▴	0.26%
	Total		20,736	18,613	▴	0.75%

=== Climate ===
Climate data for Samboan, Cebu
Month	Jan	Feb	Mar	Apr	May	Jun	Jul	Aug	Sep	Oct	Nov	Dec	Year
Mean daily maximum °C (°F)	29 (84)	29 (84)	30 (86)	32 (90)	31 (88)	30 (86)	30 (86)	30 (86)	30 (86)	29 (84)	29 (84)	29 (84)	30 (86)
Mean daily minimum °C (°F)	23 (73)	23 (73)	23 (73)	24 (75)	25 (77)	25 (77)	24 (75)	24 (75)	24 (75)	24 (75)	24 (75)	23 (73)	24 (75)
Average precipitation mm (inches)	35 (1.4)	28 (1.1)	38 (1.5)	51 (2.0)	125 (4.9)	195 (7.7)	194 (7.6)	173 (6.8)	180 (7.1)	192 (7.6)	121 (4.8)	64 (2.5)	1,396 (55)
Average rainy days	9.2	8.2	9.9	11.3	22.5	27.3	28.0	27.2	27.1	26.9	19.7	12.7	230
Source: Meteoblue

== Demographics ==
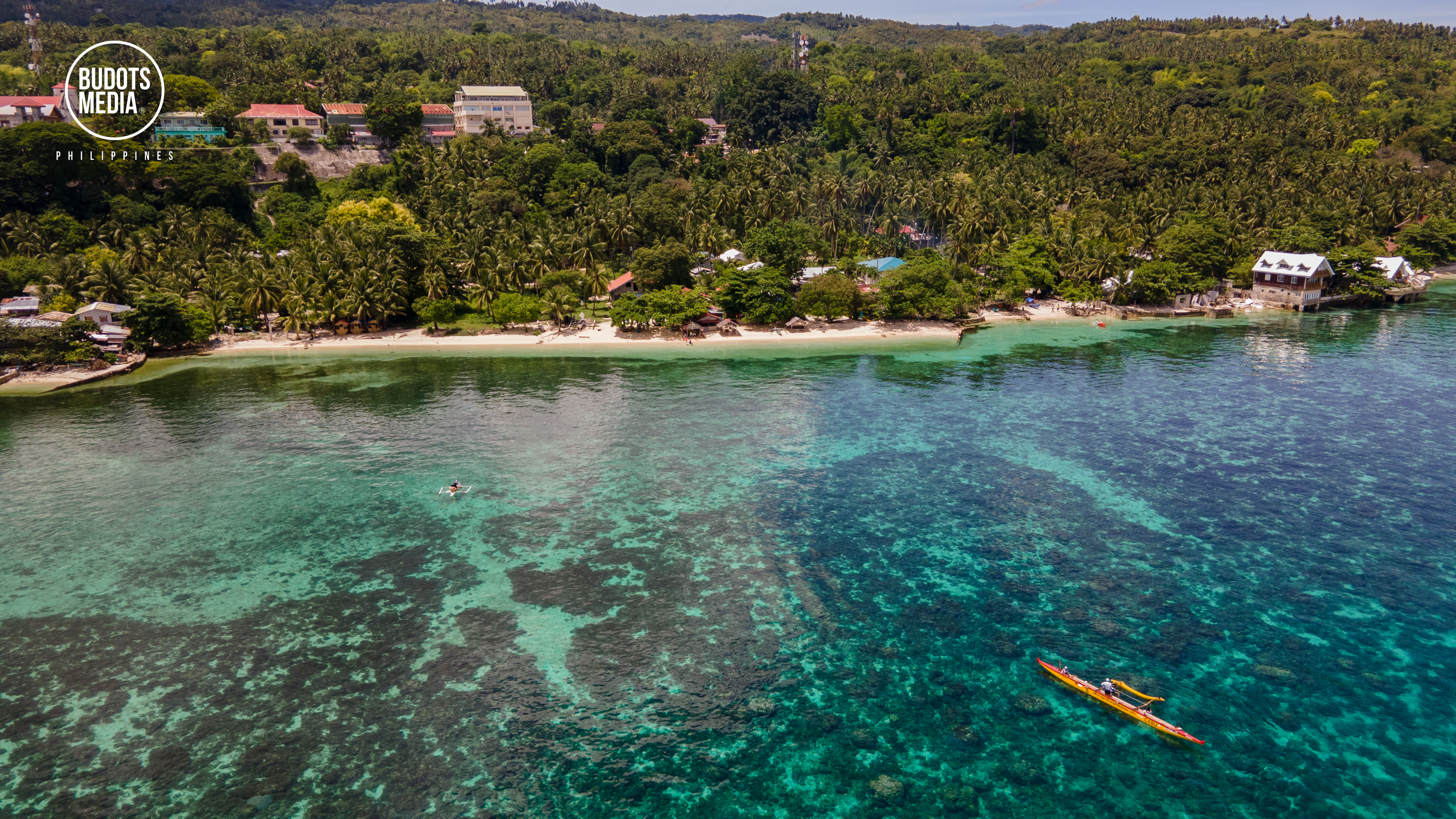
Paddle forward expedition in June, 2021 visiting Samboan. Photo: Budots Media. Outrigger canoe moored in front of Samboan Plaza.

Population census of Samboan
Year	Pop.	±% p.a.
1903	9,870	—
1918	12,039	+1.33%
1939	11,062	−0.40%
1948	11,050	−0.01%
1960	11,065	+0.01%
1970	11,804	+0.65%
1975	13,586	+2.86%
1980	14,798	+1.72%
1990	15,005	+0.14%
1995	15,770	+0.94%
2000	16,659	+1.18%
2007	18,140	+1.18%
2010	18,613	+0.94%
2015	20,884	+2.22%
2020	20,373	−0.52%
2024	20,736	+0.42%
Source: Philippine Statistics Authority

== Economy ==
Poverty incidence of Samboan (%)

Source: Philippine Statistics Authority

== Culture ==
=== Heritage buildings ===
One aspect of interest is that of Samboan's cultural heritage left by the Spanish conquerors.

St. Michael Archangel Church is one of the oldest Spanish-built churches in Cebu, made of coral stones. Today, it is a national protected heritage structure by the National Historical Commission. It has now a NHC permanent marker.

The Watch Tower is another Spanish structure, also made up of blocks of coral stones. It was built on the side of the hill to watch out for Moro invaders approaching the island. It is the tallest watch tower in the entire island of Cebu, and best preserved.

Connecting the beach area with the Spanish Watch Tower is St. Jacob's Ladder (Escala de Jacobe). It is a flight of 147 stone steps built in 1878, which leads to the old watchtower on a plateau 65 metres (213 ft) above the town. From here, one can get a view of the Tañon Strait.

The Museo de Samboan is the old municipal building of Samboan which now housed items of Samboan's way of life during our history up to the present. It was converted into a museum when the New Samboan Municipal Hall was erected.

The Samboan WWII Volunteers Monument, at the center of Poblacion on the National Highway, was built in honor of the many volunteers who fought for the freedom of the Philippines.

The San Sebastian Stone Walls are old stone structures near San Sebastian Parish Church. This may be why this barangay is popularly known as 'Bato' (meaning "stone").

The Spanish Boundary Post. It stands along the highway in Tangbo beside the Tangbo—Bonbon River Bridge. It was believed that it used to mark the boundary limit of old Poblacion but now merely serves to mark the boundary between Bonbon and Tangbo barangays.

== Tourism ==
=== Natural attractions ===
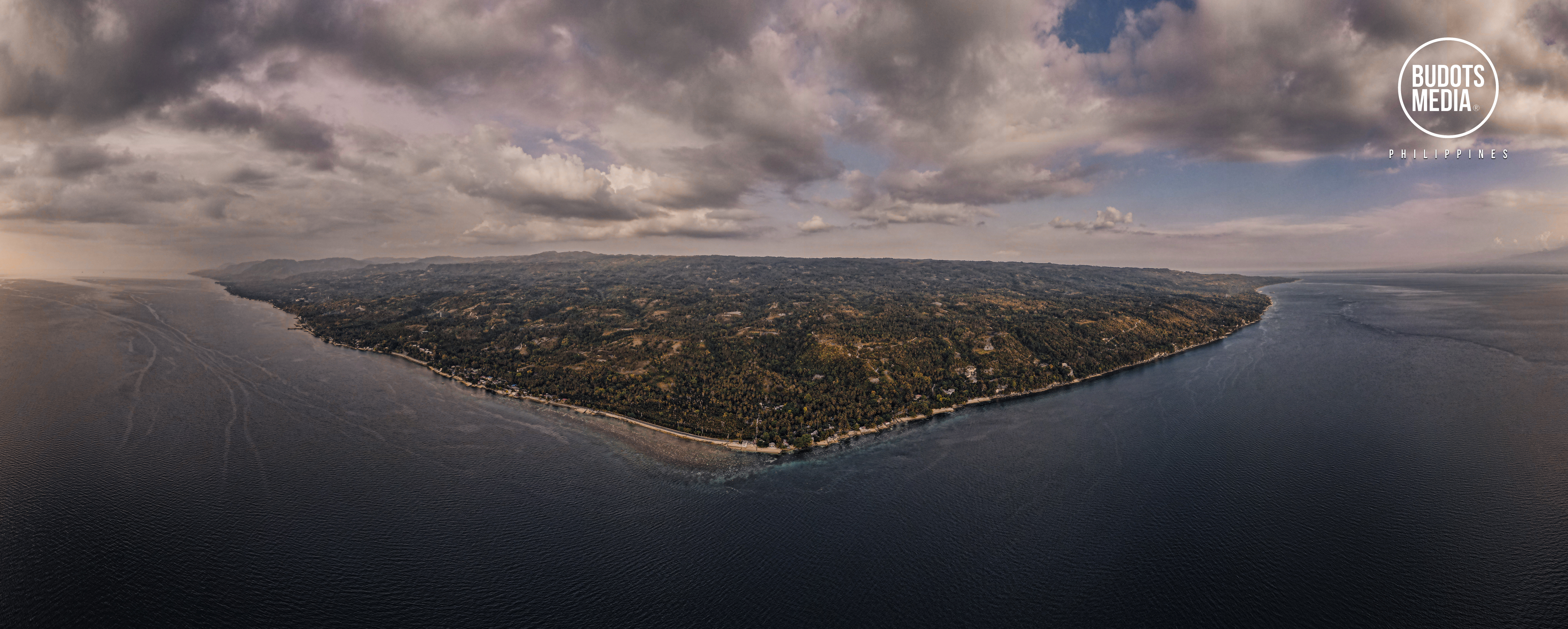
Samboan. Panorama. Aerial Photo: Budots Media

Samboan is known for its beautiful crystal clear waters with a rich marine ecosystem along its coastal barangays.

Colase Marine Sanctuary is managed by the municipality together with a fisherfolks organization. Here one can visit the fish sanctuary or dive for a fee to experience the most preserved marine ecosystem where sharks, dolphins and whales in the shallowest part of the foreshore. Aside from Colase, other coastal barangays including San Sebastian (Bato), Dalahikan, Tangbo, Bonbon, Suba and Poblacion offer the same experience generally.

Aguinid Waterfalls in Tangbo comprises five different tiers along Tangbo river. Each tier has a unique waterfall. One can never reach the peak or last waterfall without climbing the limestone walls of each waterfall from the lowest to highest.

Bonbon Binalayan Hidden Falls to the immediate south of Poblacion which some visitors call the Triple Drop Falls.

Ponong Hidden Lake is a small enclosed lagoon with a brackish water. It is unique in the sense that here is where a certain kind of bird – the "manolong" – dives into its salty waters and stays under for a long time in order to escape hunters. Today, it is perfect for relaxation, bird watching, fish feeding and firefly watching.

Balay'g Sawa Falls has a waterfall located in the heart of Samboan covered with lush forest greens. It is along the river shared by Poblacion and Bonbon. It is home to protected species including bats and siloys not to mention some local plants and trees.

Mt. Bartolina situated in between Bulangsuran and Canang (Oslob) is where one can climb the peak and see both sides of Cebu, facing Bohol Strait to the east and Tañon Strait to the west. Bartolina is the highest peak in the south of Cebu where the panoramic view of north and south Bais Bay and the rest of Negros, Siquijor, and Bohol islands can be seen.

Dau Falls is the highest waterfall in Samboan. It is located in Barangay Suba.

Tabon Falls is a recently developed natural spot found between Tangbo and Bonbon.

=== Town Fiesta ===
The town fiesta is celebrated each 29–30 September in honor of the patron saint, Michael (San Miguel, ang Arkanghel).

=== Delicacies ===
- Torta Especial (with or without coco wine) and Samboan cookies, which usually come out best during fiesta for visitors to try.
- Torta de Tangbo is said to be among the best in the locality.
- Manokhang is a native chicken cooked under coconut milk with hot pepper and "ulang" (Freshwater Shrimp).
- Linubihang Kagang is a common specialty in town from "kagang" (Land Crab) cooked with "tuno" (coconut milk).
- Tabanglang is a native dish made from sauteed "tabangka" (Snail) and "Ulang" (Freshwater Shrimp). It is a good appetizer.
- Coco Maize Pudding is locally known as "kalo-kalo" with coconut meat and corn flour (tiktik). It is a dessert served hot & cold.

== Education ==
The public schools in the town of Samboan are administered by one school district under the Schools Division of Cebu Province.

Elementary schools:

- Basak Elementary School — Basak
- Cambigong Elementary School — Cambigong
- Cañorong Elementary School — Cañorong
- Colase Elementary School — Colase
- Dalahikan Elementary School — Dalahikan
- Jumangpas Elementary School — Jumangpas
- Kalatagan Elementary School — Calatagan
- Kamburoy Elementary School — Camburoy
- Manuel L. Quezon Elementary School — Poblacion
- Monteverde Elementary School — Monteverde
- Samboan Central Elementary School — Poblacion
- San Sebastian Elementary School — San Sebastian
- Suba Elementary School — Suba
- Tangbo Elementary School — Tangbo

High schools:

- Pedro B. Uy Calderon Memorial National High School — Jumangpas
- Samboan National High School — Poblacion
- San Sebastian National High School — San Sebastian

Integrated schools:

- Bulangsuran Integrated School — Bulangsuran

Private schools:

- St. Pius X School of Samboan, Inc. — Poblacion

== Sources ==
- Balais, Harry (2012). "Chasing Waterfalls: Dau Falls". Archived from the original on 31 December 2014.
