= Santander, Cebu =

Municipality in Cebu, Philippines

Santander Tañong
- Municipality
- Municipality of Santander
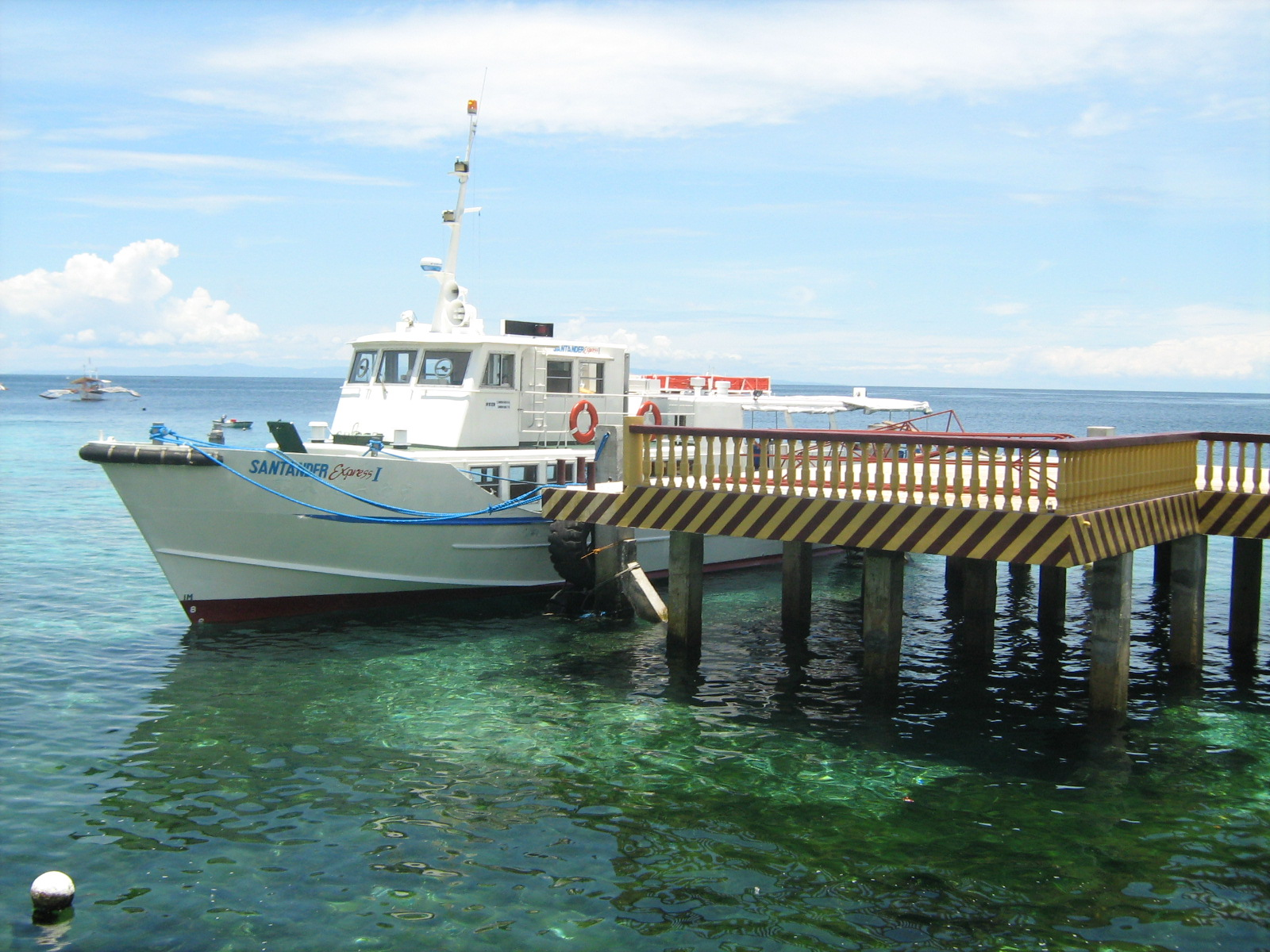
- Fast craft terminal in Liloan

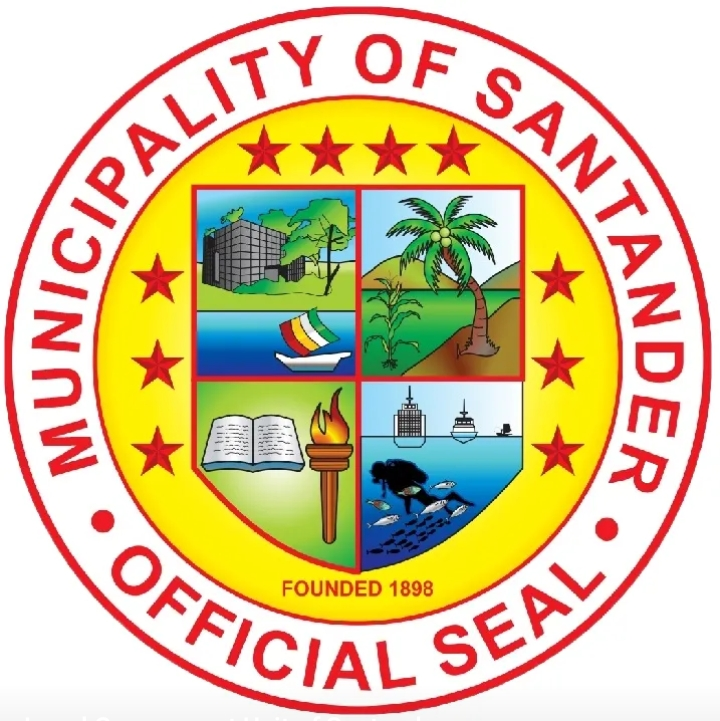
- Seal

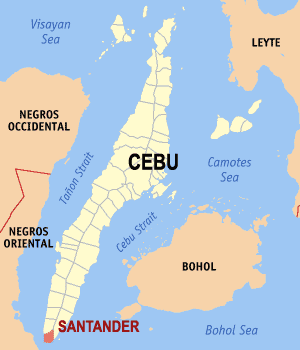
- Map of Cebu with Santander highlighted
- Interactive map of Santander
- Location within the Philippines
- Coordinates: 9°27′N 123°20′E
- Country: Philippines
- Region: Central Visayas
- Province: Cebu
- District: 2nd district
- Founded: 1867
- Named for: Santander, Spain
- Barangays: 10 (see Barangays)

Government
  - Type: Sangguniang Bayan
  - Mayor: Marites B. Buscato (1Cebu)
  - Vice Mayor: Julie Anne S. Wenceslao (1Cebu)
  - Representative: Edsel Galeos (Lakas)
  - Municipal Council: Members: Wilson S. Wenceslao; Maria Joji B. Culanag; Manuel G. Regulacion; Renato P. Estaño; Margie M. Cajigas; Judito M. Buscato; Randell L. Buscato; Napoleon Enrique M. Teves, Jr.
  - Electorate: 13,642 voters (2025)

Area
  - Total: 35.67 km^{2} (13.77 sq mi)
- Elevation: 61 m (200 ft)
- Highest elevation: 510 m (1,670 ft)
- Lowest elevation: 0 m (0 ft)

Population (2024 census)
  - Total: 18,669
  - Density: 523.4/km^{2} (1,356/sq mi)
  - Households: 4,591
- Demonym: Tañonganon

Economy
  - Income class: 4th municipal income class
  - Poverty incidence: 22.25% (2023)
  - Revenue: ₱ 129.1 million (2024)
  - Assets: ₱ 722.6 million (2024)
  - Expenditure: ₱ 84.41 million (2024)
  - Liabilities: ₱ 210.9 million (2024)

Service provider
  - Electricity: Cebu 1 Electric Cooperative (CEBECO 1)
- Time zone: UTC+8 (PST)
- ZIP code: 6026
- PSGC: 072245000
- IDD : area code: +63 (0)32
- Native languages: Cebuano; Tagalog
- Website: santander.gov.ph

Santander, officially the Municipality of Santander (Cebuano: Lungsod sa Santander; Tagalog: Bayan ng Santander), is a municipality in the province of Cebu, Philippines. According to the 2024 census, it has a population of 18,669 people.

Santander is located approximately 134 kilometers south of Cebu City. It is the southernmost municipality in the Province of Cebu, bounded by the municipality of Oslob to the northeast and the municipality of Samboan to the northwest. To the southeast lies the Bohol Strait, while the Tañon Strait borders its southwestern coast. Santander serves as Cebu's gateway to the neighboring Province of Negros Oriental through its three ports: one in Barangay Talisay, which accommodates barges and ferryboats bound for Tampi, Amlan, Negros Oriental; and two in Barangay Lilo-an, which serve pump boats and fast craft traveling to Sibulan, Negros Oriental. Regular bus services ply the Cebu–Negros route via these ports.During the nineteenth century, under the leadership of Fr. Julian Bermejo, parish priest of Boljoon beginning in 1802, four stone watchtowers (baluartes) were constructed in Santander as part of the defense system established along Cebu's southeastern coast against Moro raids.² These watchtowers guarded the Tañon Strait and the approaches to the coastal towns of Negros across the strait, underscoring Santander's longstanding importance as the southern gateway of Cebu.

== History and Origin of the Town Name ==
=== During Pre-Spanish Era ===
The earliest inhabitants of Tañong, like the rest of the Visayans, were generally more corpulent, better built, and somewhat taller than the Tagalogs. Most of the men were dark-skinned because they spent much of their time outdoors, often wearing only minimal clothing under the sun. The women, who generally remained at home, were fairer in complexion than the men. They typically had round faces, black eyes, were generally of short stature, and had flat noses.

Teeth-filing practices, known as sangka, were common among both male and female Cebuanos, as well as among other Visayan groups. This practice involved filing the front surface of the teeth horizontally while straightening and widening the sharp lower edge, resulting in teeth that were evenly aligned both lengthwise and across. The procedure was performed by a skilled practitioner using a slender stone file, sometimes removing as much as half of the tooth in the process. After filing, the teeth were stained in various ways by chewing substances that imparted color, such as betel nut, which gave the teeth a reddish hue. In addition, some natives adorned their teeth with gold through inlays, crowns, or plating. Among Visayan women, hair received considerable attention, and they took great care to keep it clean and well combed, washing it with tree bark used as a natural soap. They also applied fragrant oils, such as sesame oil, to promote hair growth and eliminate lice. Men generally did not wear their hair as long as women did, although longer hairstyles were customary in some parts of the Visayan Islands.

Both men and women customarily wore gold earrings, with two or three piercings made in each ear. Over time, the piercings became larger as the earlobes stretched under the weight of the ornaments attached to them. Two types of earrings were commonly worn by both sexes: one was concave and circular, worn so that only the gold was visible and not the flesh; the other was worn over the first and fastened securely to the piercing to prevent it from falling off. An example of such a gold earring was uncovered during an archaeological excavation in Boljoon, another southern municipality of Cebu located just a few kilometers from Santander.

=== During the Spanish Colonial Era ===
==== The Establishment of Pueblo de Santander ====
In general, the establishment of cities and towns in the Philippines was a result of colonial policies and bureaucratic legislation. In the creation of towns, certain procedures established by the colonial bureaucracy had to be strictly observed by interested parties. The cabezas de barangay and principales of the barrios concerned were required to inform the alcalde in writing of their desire to merge their barrios into an independent town. The documents had to be duly signed by the petitioners and accompanied by supporting evidence to substantiate their reasons for separating from their mother town. Among the required documents were lists of annual tributes collected from each barangay, affidavits from the gobernadorcillo of the mother town and neighboring towns attesting to claims regarding boundaries, distances, and the number of tributes collected. In addition, the petitioners were required to obtain the affirmation of the parish priest, clearly defining the boundaries of the proposed town and providing a detailed map of the area.

Upon receipt of the petition, the alcalde would review the documents to determine their validity. He would either return them to the petitioners if revisions were necessary or make the appropriate recommendations to the governor-general. The Asesor General de Gobierno of the Office of the Governor-General would then review the petition for approval. If the petition was approved, the governor-general would issue a Superior Decree, a copy of which would be furnished to the alcalde and the Gobernador Yntendente de Visayas. They would then inform the townspeople of the outcome of their petition.

In the case of Santander, the approval process took several years from the time the petition was submitted. Santander became a separate pueblo from Oslob only in 1867. It was established as such simultaneously with two other pueblos in the southeastern part of Cebu, namely, Alcoy and Caceres. Several reasons were cited as the basis for the establishment of these three pueblos, foremost among them being “the distance that separates these districts and visitas from their respective ‘parent’ pueblos, which prevents efficient and prompt administration.

Aside from this, these districts were required to have a sufficient number of inhabitants to constitute another municipality and must not have any topographical obstacles that would hinder their establishment. However, the parishes of these three pueblos had not yet been established at that time due to a Royal Order regulating the creation of new parishes. The newly established pueblo de Santander consisted of the composite visita of Tañong, which was then part of the pueblo de Oslob, and the village of San Sebastian, which was then part of the pueblo de Sambuan.

==== The Establishment of a Parroquia ====
Before Santander became a parish, baptisms were registered in the Oslob parish. New converts were trained as catechists so that they could assist in supervising catechism lessons for new learners. Missionaries made extensive use of visual aids depicting the teachings of the Catholic faith. Visayan versions of various prayers were also developed, although these often retained some Spanish terms that had no exact equivalents in the local language. Sermons usually centered on four basic themes: hell and purgatory, the immortality of the soul, the existence of God, and the rewards awaiting Christians in the next life. During regular visits, missionaries would preach short discourses on any of these topics and provide catechism instruction to children.

The petition for the creation of a parish was usually submitted after the establishment of a town. In a letter addressed to the bishop, the gobernadorcillo and the town’s principalia were required to justify why the settlement should be established as an independent parish and consequently assigned a permanent priest. The petitioners had to demonstrate that the town’s tribute collection exceeded the required quota of 500 tributantes. They also had to cite the abundance of natural resources in the town and the loyalty of its inhabitants. These claims had to be supported by relevant documents. The bishop would then forward the petition to the Office of the Governor-General, where it would be evaluated by the Asesor General de Gobierno. Similar to the establishment of a town, a Superior Decree would be issued and signed by the governor-general, with copies furnished to the alcalde, the Gobernador Yntendente de Visayas, and the bishop of the diocese. However, even with the issuance of the decree, a parish priest would not necessarily be assigned immediately. Once a priest became available, the bishop would then issue a diocesan decree appointing him to the newly established parish.

It was not until 1897 that the visita of Tañong became a separate parish from its mother parish of Oslob, by virtue of the approval of Real Order No. 1198 dated November 27, 1896, which took effect on February 27, 1897. Following its declaration as an independent parish, the necessary documents were prepared to allow the construction of a church to begin. Normally, priests were required to obtain permission from the bishop before undertaking church construction. All infrastructure projects, including church construction, were supervised by the Obras Públicas, which was established by the government in 1867. Church construction involved both skilled and unskilled laborers, most of whom were local residents. The duration of construction depended on the availability of financial resources, building materials, the size of the church, and the determination of the community to complete the entire structure.

The construction of the Santander parish church took an entire year and was completed only in 1898.It was Fr. Mauricio Alvarez, during his third tenure as parish priest of Oslob from 1889 to 1898, who supervised the construction of the church in Santander. The church was reportedly built using mampostería and tabique de pampango, construction methods commonly used in many Spanish-period churches. Mampostería is a Spanish masonry technique involving stone and mortar construction. In its simplest form, masons assembled stone rubble walls by mortaring individual stones together over bedrock or a foundation of compacted sand, earth, or stone. Tabique de pampango is a type of construction consisting of a wooden or bamboo framework covered with a mortar finish made of sand and lime. Aside from the church, Alvarez is also credited with the construction of a provisional cemetery, a convent, and school buildings. As with most, if not all, Spanish-period churches in Cebu, the façade of the original church faced the sea. It also served as a kind of watchtower during the period of Moro raids. The church was built atop a promontory approximately 50 meters from the baluarte in Barangay Poblacion, with a stone stairway leading down to the seacoast. To support the needs of a regular parish priest, the Catholic Church would request the local population to donate agricultural lands, in addition to the lot on which the church was constructed. In Pasil, the family of Leon Duranparang, Gregoria Miral, and the Dangculos family donated parcels of land to the Catholic Church. The land on which the church was built was reportedly donated by Bernardo Jugo.

The Santander parish was reportedly originally dedicated to Madre de Dios y Sagrado Corazón de Jesús (Mother of God and the Sacred Heart of Jesus). The earliest baptismal record (bautismo) in the parish was that of Pedro Cumayas, who was born on February 12, 1898. Earlier baptisms had been conducted in the parish of Oslob. The first parish priest was Fr. Gregorio de Santiago, a Spanish missionary who served from February to October of that year. In November 1898, he was replaced by Fr. Matías Gonzales, also a Spanish missionary, who served until 1906. The last Spanish missionary to serve as parish priest was Fr. Silverio Perez, who was known for his campaign against the Protestants during his term from 1906 to 1907. During the early years of the American colonial period in the Philippines, Protestant teachers were deployed to various municipalities. In Santander, the Spanish Catholic parish priest may have perceived their presence as a threat and consequently led his parishioners to attack the Protestants. This conflict between Catholics and Protestants in Santander will be discussed in the next chapter.

Santander’s location along Tañon Strait was the reason why the place was originally called Tañong. The people were called Tañonganons. The name Tañong was said to have been later changed to Santander by one of the visiting Spanish missionary-priests, after Santander, Cantabaria, his hometown, which was situated in the north coast of Spain.

== Geography ==
Santander's terrain is dominated by a backdrop of rugged ranges which raise from a flat narrow coastal plain. Strongly sloping to sleepy sloping contours are scattered throughout the municipality.

Santander is bordered to the north by the towns of Oslob and Samboan, to the west is Tañon Strait, to the east is the Cebu Strait, and to the south is the province of Negros Oriental in Negros Island. Santander is the southernmost municipality of Cebu province 133 kilometres (83 mi) south of Cebu City.

== Barangays and the Origins of Their Names ==
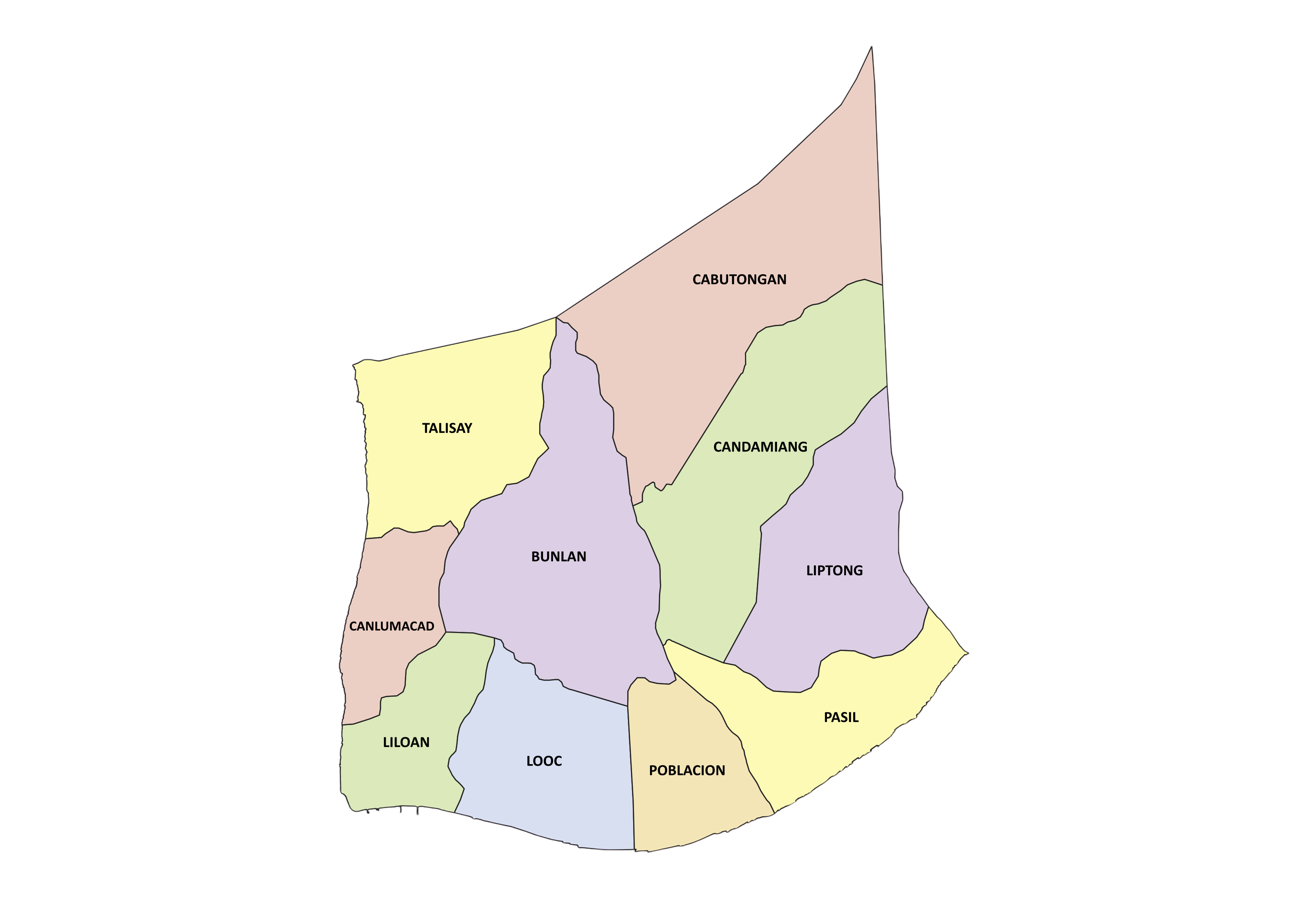
Political map of Santander

The municipality of Santander is composed of ten barangays, six of which are coastal, namely Talisay, Canlumacad, Liloan, Looc, Poblacion and Pasil. Four are mountain barangays, namely Bunlan, Cabutongan, Kandamiang and Liptong. Of these barangays, only the name “Poblacion” traces its origin to a Spanish term. The word poblacion in Spanish means center of population. This barrio may have been the town center created by the Spanish missionaries, since it is located on a slightly elevated area set back from the coast, thus protecting it from the rampant Moro raids at that time.

The names of some of its barangays such as Pasil, Liloan, Looc, Talisay, and Liptong are probably original Sugbuanon names suggesting geographical or natural reference points. The term lilo from which barangay Liloan’s name may have originated means whirlpool. Whirlpools, or more specifically, eddies, abound in its waters resulting from the meeting of opposing currents (locally called salibod) from the Tañon Strait and the Bohol Strait. According to local residents, the whirpools are especially vigorous three days before “mopatay ang buwan” (there is new moon) and three days after. There are stories that a Spanish galleon capsized in these waters due to the strong whirpools or eddies abounding in the area. In fact, there have been many Japanese as well as Filipino treasure hunters who have tried to dive and the shipwreck, but due to the strong cross-currents they have not been successful. The 1906 Coastal and Geodetic Survey describes Liloan Point as sandy and steep, with an old stone fort. Vessels can anchor near the point at depths of between 7 to 14 fathoms. A very steep incline extends all the way to the bottom and the currents run very strong. Between Liloan Point and Tañon Point, counter-currents coming from the opposite direction pass very close to the coast.

The term looc on the other hand, literally means bay or cove. Barangay Looc is located along such a bay. The 1906 Coastal and Geodetic Survey describes this area as the south entrance of Tañon Strait. From Liloan Point the coast turns due east for 2 ½ miles to Tañon Point, characterized by an almost uninterrupted sandy beach .7 Barangay Looc is located between the Poblacion and Barangay Liloan. The bay is formed like a letter C. It serves as a hiding place for fisherfolks during windy and stormy days at sea. The seawaters of the bay are always calm and peaceful, because of its sheltered location. Old folks used to say that the place was “na-luop” (meaning located inland). The name later became Looc.

In Cebuano, pasil refers to a rocky area along the seashore formed by the action of the sea. Pasil is said to have been the original settlement site of Tañong prior to Spanish colonization. However, because of the frequent Moro raids on settlements along the southeastern coast during the eighteenth and nineteenth centuries, Spanish officials established the town center farther inland and away from the coast. Consequently, the poblacion of Santander is situated on higher ground than Pasil.

Barangay Talisay is named after the tree species locally named talisay (Terminalia catappa). It is a large tree which grows by the seashore bearing edible nuts. One such tree grew along the coast of the barangay, giving shade to travelers, shers and shell gleaners (manginginhas) over the years. The talisay tree is no longer there as it was uprooted by big waves during a storm. The barangay’s original name, however, was said to be Campisot (or Kang pisot) pertaining to the pisot nga balat, a species of sea cucumber which was once abundant in the area during low tide and was a popular source of food for the locals at that time. The name was changed to Talisay in 1948 as a consequence of a resolution hailed by one of the town councilors, Casiano Miramon who hailed from this barangay, and subsequently approved by the municipal council. As discussed above, it is apparent that the names of Santander’s coastal barangays have something to do with the sea and its surrounding.

Some of Santander’s mountain barangays may also have derived their names from plants and from bodies of water. Cabutongan, an upland barangay which was originally a sitio of Brgy. Kandamiang, probably derived its name also from a bamboo species locally called butung. Butung (Gigantachloa levis) is a kind of spineless bamboo which is thick, straight and smooth. Given that this species of bamboo may have been abundant in the area, the Historical Data Paper prepared by the school principal of Santander in 1953 points this out as the origin of the name Cabutongan. This should debunk the misconception that the name of the barangay was derived from “butong”, a Cebuano term for the young and green coconut fruit. Another sitio, that of Kalunasan, in Brgy. Liptong, is also named after another type of spineless bamboo called lunas.

Barangay Liptong may have derived its name from a body of water in the area. In Cebuano, the term liptong refers to a lake formed by a river as a result of an obstruction. In Santander, however, older residents used the term libtong, which means a pool of water. The river that runs near Liptong Elementary School consists of a series of small waterfalls and pools, the most well-known of which is Ambakon Falls, which flows into the lowest pool.

There are also barangay names that apparently imply ownership, such as Canlumacad (Kang Lumacad) and Kandamiang (Kang Damiang). However, according to the Santander Historical Data Paper, the term Canlumacad suggests "fast walkers,"¹³ apparently derived from the root word lakad (which in Tagalog means "walk"). In Cebuano, however, lakad means "to step over." Since Canlumacad is located between the barangays of Liloan and Talisay, the term may have been used to mean "to step over" to the next barrio. According to local folklore, however, the place was originally called Cambuyong (from Kang Buyong). Buyong is said to have been the original settler of the area. He was described as itikon ("like a duck") because he was short—less than three feet tall—but had large buttocks. His real name was Jorge, but he was nicknamed Buyong, or sometimes "Jorgeng Itikon." His descendants reportedly shared his physical characteristics, and they were the ones who inhabited the area in earlier times. Thus, the place came to be known as Cambuyong. This barangay was originally a sitio of Barangay Liloan, while its southern section was once part of Barangay Talisay. During the term of Mayor Sol Abines in 1972, and upon the directive of then Cebu Governor Eduardo Gullas, a new barangay was created in Santander.

The Historical Data Paper traces the name Kandamiang to the presence of numerous trees and shrubs spread throughout the area,¹⁵ in reference to the Cebuano word damyang, which means "spread out." Local folklore, however, suggests that Kandamiang is derived from a woman named Damiana (the Cebuano prefix kang or kan denotes ownership or possession). Damiana was said to have been an elderly, unmarried dressmaker who was well known for making fine garments from locally woven cloth made of cotton and maguey fibers. She became so well known that people referred to the place where she lived as Ka Damiana (meaning "Damiana's place"). Over time, this evolved into the name Kandamiang. Before it came to be known as Kandamiang, however, the area was originally called Canibihan, a name that referred to the dominant type of vegetation that once grew there.

The origin of the name Bunlan is unclear. The most plausible derivation is from the Cebuano term bunul, which means "to make the soil firm and compact." The original form may have been bunulan, a verb, which was later shortened to Bunlan.

=== Population of Each Barangay ===
PSGC	Barangay	Population			±% p.a.	
		2024		2010		
072245001	Bunlan	12.3%	2,296	1,929	▴	1.21%
072245002	Cabutongan	7.0%	1,310	1,090	▴	1.27%
072245003	Candamiang	6.2%	1,151	899	▴	1.72%
072245010	Canlumacad	4.7%	875	769	▴	0.89%
072245004	Liloan	12.5%	2,330	1,950	▴	1.23%
072245005	Lip‑tong	7.2%	1,337	1,138	▴	1.12%
072245006	Looc	11.7%	2,190	1,899	▴	0.99%
072245007	Pasil	8.6%	1,603	1,514	▴	0.39%
072245008	Poblacion	15.5%	2,902	2,583	▴	0.81%
072245009	Talisay	13.6%	2,533	2,334	▴	0.57%
	Total		18,669	16,105	▴	1.02%

=== Climate ===
Climate data for Santander, Cebu
Month	Jan	Feb	Mar	Apr	May	Jun	Jul	Aug	Sep	Oct	Nov	Dec	Year
Mean daily maximum °C (°F)	29 (84)	30 (86)	31 (88)	32 (90)	31 (88)	30 (86)	29 (84)	29 (84)	29 (84)	29 (84)	29 (84)	29 (84)	30 (86)
Mean daily minimum °C (°F)	22 (72)	22 (72)	22 (72)	23 (73)	24 (75)	24 (75)	24 (75)	24 (75)	24 (75)	24 (75)	23 (73)	22 (72)	23 (74)
Average precipitation mm (inches)	26 (1.0)	22 (0.9)	28 (1.1)	41 (1.6)	95 (3.7)	136 (5.4)	147 (5.8)	126 (5.0)	132 (5.2)	150 (5.9)	98 (3.9)	46 (1.8)	1,047 (41.3)
Average rainy days	7.5	6.7	8.9	10.4	21.6	25.6	26.3	25.0	24.1	26.2	19.2	12.1	213.6
Source: Meteoblue

The climate of Santander is classified as Af ('Tropical monsoon'). All 12 months have an average precipitation of at least 60 millimetres (2.4 in) rainfall per month. Based on temperature, the warmest months of the year are March through October; the winter monsoon brings cooler air from November to February. May is the warmest month, and January, the coolest.

== Demographics ==
Santander Municipal Hall

Population census of Santander
Year	Pop.	±% p.a.
1903	5,448	—
1918	7,584	+2.23%
1939	6,507	−0.73%
1948	6,434	−0.13%
1960	6,629	+0.25%
1970	8,646	+2.69%
1975	9,887	+2.73%
1980	10,979	+2.12%
1990	11,831	+0.75%
1995	12,382	+0.86%
2000	13,842	+2.42%
2007	15,294	+1.39%
2010	16,105	+1.90%
2015	17,857	+1.99%
2020	18,527	+0.78%
2024	18,669	+0.18%
Source: Philippine Statistics Authority

The death rate is 3.06 per 1000 people, or 0.306%.

=== Language ===
Most of the Tañonganons (people living in Santander) speak Cebuano. In schools, Tagalog and English languages are taught and used as a major instruction in all subjects.

== Economy ==
Poverty incidence of Santander (%)

Source: Philippine Statistics Authority

Santander is the smallest town in Cebu. The majority of the people depend on the sea for livelihood – fishermen who continually explore the vast Palawan and East Philippine seas in search for rich fishing grounds. The method of fishing used is the destructive muro-ami technique, which has been banned on several occasions due to its negative effects on marine life.

In the 1990s, there were four wholesale enterprises, one superstore and few Sari-sari stores. There was also an improvised market composed mostly of talipapas (fish markets). These were located along Jose Rizal Street beside the Municipal building. By the year 2001, the business establishments began to grow and develop. Many larger businesses have been established in Santander such as LGC Marketing. The major agricultural produce in Santander is corn, copra, and root crops (cassava and sweet potato). Most people, particularly those living in mountain barangays, plant corn as a source of income.

Santander's municipal income classification is fourth class.

== Transportation ==
Santander serves as one of the seaports connecting to the province of Negros Oriental with its passenger ferries making way to Sibulan in just 20 minutes.

Roll-on roll-off (RORO) barges of the Maayo Shipping Lines also carry vehicles between the ports of Liloan, Santander and Sibulan with trips taking about 30 minutes; and between Liloan and Larena, Siquijor in about 1 hour and 30 minutes.

Several buses and vans-for-hire travel to and from Santander at 20-minute intervals. The ride from Cebu South Bus Terminal in Cebu City is three to four hours.

A wharf in Barangay Talisay takes passengers via fastcrafts or barges to Tampi, San Jose. There are also two ports in Barangay Liloan, one for fastcrafts and another for pumpboats to Sibulan, Negros Oriental.

== Tourism ==
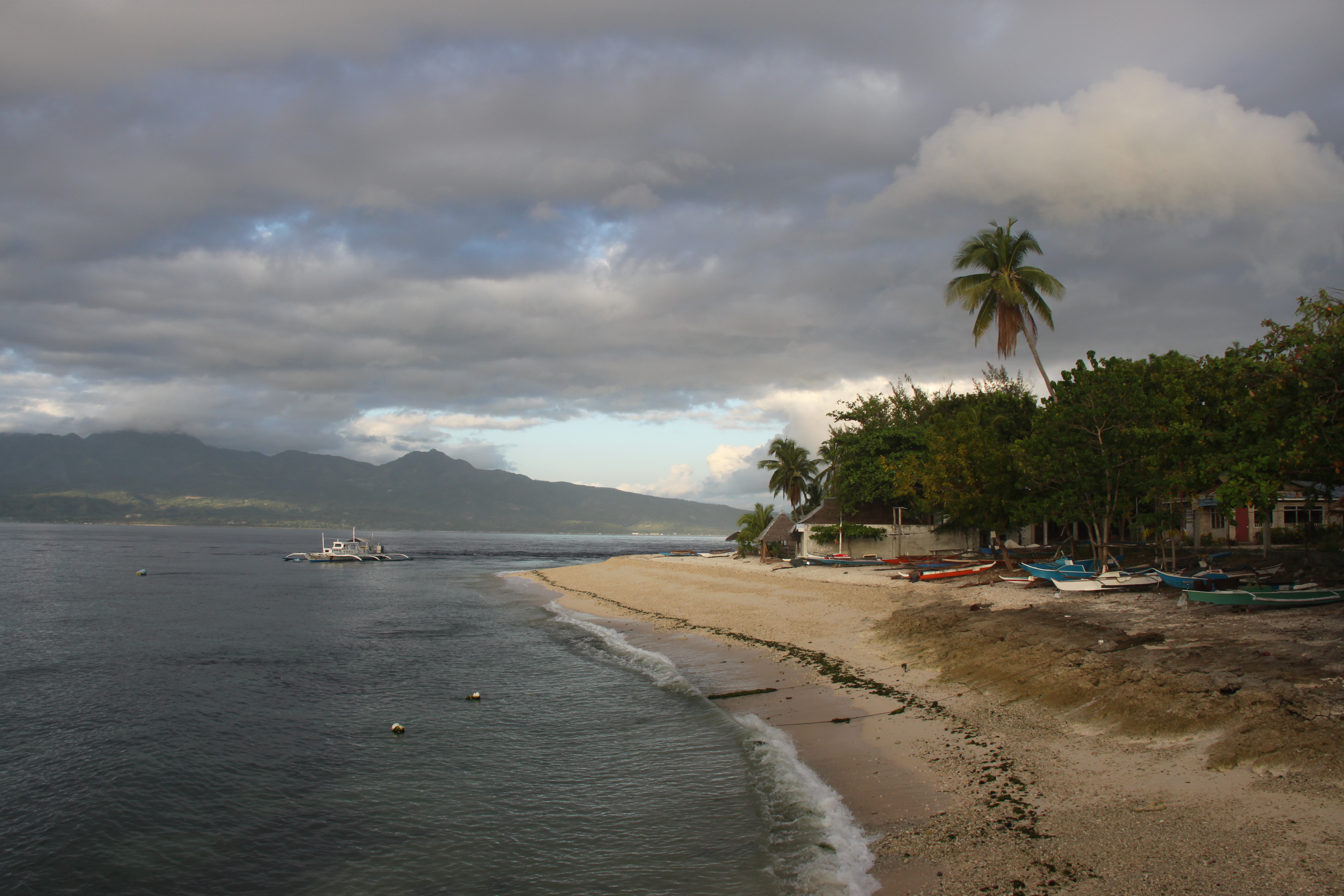
Waterfront of Santander, with Negros Oriental in the background

Santander's popularity as a tourist destination has increased in the past few years, since it serves as the hub for some world-renowned dive spots like Apo Island, Balicasag, Pescador Island, Sumilon and Siquijor. This is also reflected in the growth of Santander in the tourism industry. Six years ago there were only two resorts, still open today. Today there are eleven.

== Sports ==
Basketball is the most popular sport in Santander. This game is usually played in the afternoons where school time is over and also for the adults whose work hours is done (specially construction works). During summer, a lot of basketball competitions between different barangays. This was done in order that youths avoid vices and illegal drugs. Volleyball is also played in summer competitions but it is more usually participated in by women. Other sports such as baseball and football are also played in Santander.

== Education ==
The public schools in the town of Santander are administered by one school district under the Schools Division of Cebu Province.

Elementary schools:

- Bunlan Elementary School — Bunlan
- Cabutongan Elementary School — Cabutongan
- Kandamiang Elementary School — Candamiang
- Liloan Elementary School — Liloan
- Liptong Elementary School — Liptong
- Looc Elementary School — Looc
- Pasil Elementary School — Pasil
- Santander Central Elementary School — N. Bacalso Avenue, Poblacion
- Talisay Elementary School — Talisay

High schools:

- Santander National High School — Poblacion
- Willy B. Wenceslao Memorial National High School — Poblacion

Private schools:

- Lyceum of Cebu - Santander Campus — Looc
- Archbishop Teofilo B. Camomot Catholic School of Santander Inc. — Poblacion
