= Voyevodin =

Voyevodin or Voevodin (Russian: Воеводин) is a Russian masculine surname, its feminine counterpart is Voyevodina or Voevodina. It may refer to

- Aleksey Voyevodin (born 1970), Russian race walker
- Alexander Voevodin (born 1949), Soviet-born biomedical scientist and educator
- Oksana Voevodina (born 1992), Russian model, former wife of Sultan Muhammad V of Kelantan
- Pyotr Voevodin (1884–1964), Russian revolutionary, Soviet politician and film industry figure
- Vladimir Voevodin (1962–2026), Russian computer scientist and academic
- Yuliya Voyevodina (born 1971), Russian race walker, wife of Aleksey Voyevodin
- Pavel Voevodin, Soviet arms designer during World War II
  - Voevodin pistol, a pistol designed by Pavel Voevodin
