= Illegal firearm trade in the Philippines =

The creation, selling, and smuggling of illegal firearms is one of the most common criminal activities in the Philippines. Filipino-made local guns, built in secret factories, are sold and circulated not just in the country but also abroad.

== History ==
Filipino gunsmithing can be traced back to World War II when Filipino guerrillas fighting the Imperial Japanese built their own weapons and firearms, most notably the paltik, boga, and guerilla shotguns. In some instances, the gunsmiths recruited were tasked to rechamber captured Arisaka rifles to use .30-06 Springfield rounds.

After the war, knowledge of firearms manufacturing were passed down to the present day, many of whom continued to build firearms in secret huts and factories inside jungles and mountains, with Danao, Cebu being the area most well-known for making illegal firearms. Factories in Samar and Mindanao also exist. Mayor Ramonito "Nito" Durano III of Cebu have once tried to reach out to President Rodrigo Duterte in the hopes of discussing the possibility of legalizing such gunsmithing factories.

Most of these firearms end up being sold to private citizens, insurgents, and criminals. Syndicates in the Philippines have also taken advantage of the illegal firearm trade, with the Waray-Waray Gang and Bahala Na Gang being some of the most notable firearm trafficking group in the Philippines.

== Firearm types ==
Common illegally manufactured firearms in the Philippines include:

- Paltik
- Various M1911s
- Various revolvers
- M16 rifles (5.56mm NATO and .30-06 ammo)
- Uzi
- MAC-11

== International shipment ==
Filipino guns have been smuggled and used in the United States and Japan, mostly in the hands of gangs. The most common ones sold are homemade Colt .45s and assault rifles. One notable example was how the police department of Glendale, Arizona wrote in their gang training manual the Bahala Na Gang's ability to traffic weapons throughout the state. Another infamous case occurred on November 29, 2019, when Yakuza leader Keiichi Furukawa of the Yamaguchi-gumi was gunned down by a splinter Kobe group with an M653P rifle, a weapon that originated from the Philippines.
