= Illegal drug trade in the Philippines =

Sale and distribution of illegal narcotics in the Philippines

The prevalence of illegal drug use in the Philippines is lower than the global average, according to the United Nations Office on Drugs and Crime (UNODC). President Rodrigo Duterte has claimed that the country could become a "narco-state". Two of the most used and valuable illegal drugs in the country are methamphetamine hydrochloride (known locally as shabu) and marijuana. In 2012, the United Nations said the Philippines had the highest rate of methamphetamine use in East Asia, and according to a U.S. State Department report, 2.1 percent of Filipinos aged 16 to 64 use the drug based on 2008 figures by the Philippines Dangerous Drugs Board. As of 2016, the United Nations Office of Drugs and Crime report that 1.1 percent of Filipinos aged 10 to 69 use the drug. In Metro Manila, most barangays are affected by illegal drugs.

== Production ==
=== Methamphetamine production ===
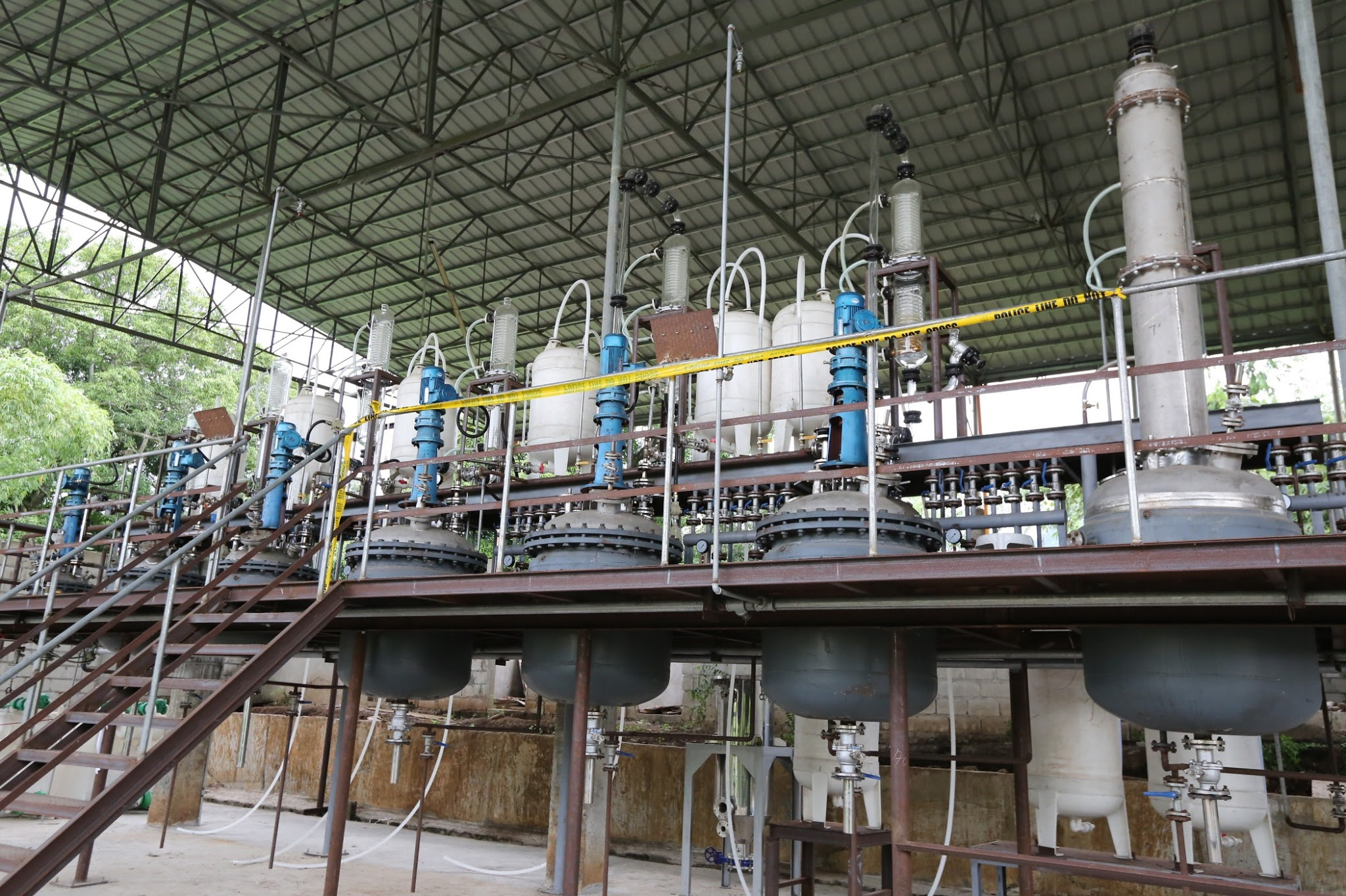
Seized meth laboratory in Pampanga.

Drug syndicates have been producing methamphetamine in small-scale and kitchen-type laboratories to avoid detection by the Philippine authorities since 2010. Usually, drug syndicates rent warehouses for use as drug laboratories. These syndicates have moved towards renting houses in private subdivisions, condominiums and apartments to be used as bases for their illegal drug production. Private properties are becoming more favorable to drug syndicates as sites of illegal drug production.

Methamphetamine remains more feasible to sell in the Philippines than cocaine, a more costly illegal drug.

Owing to its geographical location, international drug syndicates use the Philippines as a transit hub for the illegal drug trade. Some local drug syndicates are also involved in the international illegal drug trade, and utilize drug mules to transport small amounts of illegal drugs to other countries. Some overseas Filipino workers have been utilized by drug syndicates as drug mules, either knowingly or unknowingly. Most Filipino drug mules, mainly women, are sent to China, where drug convicts will face execution via lethal injection. Ninoy Aquino International Airport has been identified as a favorable illegal drug trafficking hub.

Some Filipinos choose to be involved in drug trafficking due to the promise of a high income. Some still participate in such illicit activity because they are forced by certain circumstances. There were reports in the past that some Filipinos, usually women, were forced and blackmailed by drug syndicates to work as drug couriers, and if they refused, their family's safety would be compromised.

A Manila-based firm, Pacific Strategies & Assessments, identified the Philippines as, "not only a transhipment point, but also a key producer of synthetic drugs for all of Asia" in a report made in 2009.

In December 2013, the Philippine National Police – Anti-Illegal Drugs Special Operations Task Force and the Philippine Drug Enforcement confirmed reports that the Mexican Sinaloa Cartel had started operations in the country.

== Chinese cartel involvement ==
About nine Chinese drug cartels are involved on most illegal drug trade in the Philippines. The U.S. Department of State found out that Chinese drug cartels are behind the trade of methamphetamine hydrochloride on the Philippines.

The president divulged the names of the members of a large Chinese triad group in an interview with PTV-4 on July 7. The members of the triad group included Chinese drug lords, namely Wu Tuan, aka tatay Co, Jameson Ching, Peter Lim, aka tiger balm, and Herbert Colangco, with the three under the protection of Marcelo Garbo Jr, one of the Philippine National Police generals named by Duterte on July 5.

== Mexican cartel involvement ==
In a raid on a small cock-fighting operation in Lipa city, officials found 84 kilograms of methamphetamine also known by the locals as "shabu." In the raid three affiliates of the Sinaloa Cartel were arrested, the Sinaloa Cartel being led by drug lord Joaquin "El Chapo" Guzman.

== Trade value ==
According to a 2010 U.S. International Narcotics Control Strategy Report the Philippine Drug Enforcement Agency's Director General estimated that the value of the illegal drug trade in the Philippines to be worth $6.4 to $8.4 billion annually.

== Party drugs ==
MDMA (ecstasy), one of the party drugs, is the third most abused drug, next to cannabis and methamphetamine.

The Philippine Drug Enforcement Agency discovered the production of "fly high", after a raid on a condominium unit in Makati. The effects of use of fly high includes sleeplessness, loss of appetite, and high libido.

In May 2019, 39 bricks of cocaine valued at around 4 million were found by fishermen in the Philippines. While officials believe that this cocaine was in transit to Australia, Philippine Drug Enforcement Agency believes this was intended to be a diversion.

== Drug use among minors ==
Inhalants are commonly used among minors, especially street children. Street children in the Philippines are most likely to be inhalant abusers.

Philippine Drug Enforcement Agency statistics of 2014 recorded 40% of minors arrested for drug possession, and drug syndicates use children as drug pushers. Children arrested for drug possession or use are brought to the Department of Social Welfare and Development (DSWD), in compliance to Republic Act No. 9344 (Juvenile Justice and Welfare Act of 2006).

== See also ==
- Comprehensive Dangerous Drugs Act of 2002
- Close-Up Forever Summer concert tragedy
- Philippine drug war

General:

- Crime in the Philippines
  - Illegal firearm trade in the Philippines
