= Khyber Pass copy =

Afghan-Pakistani tribal firearm replicas

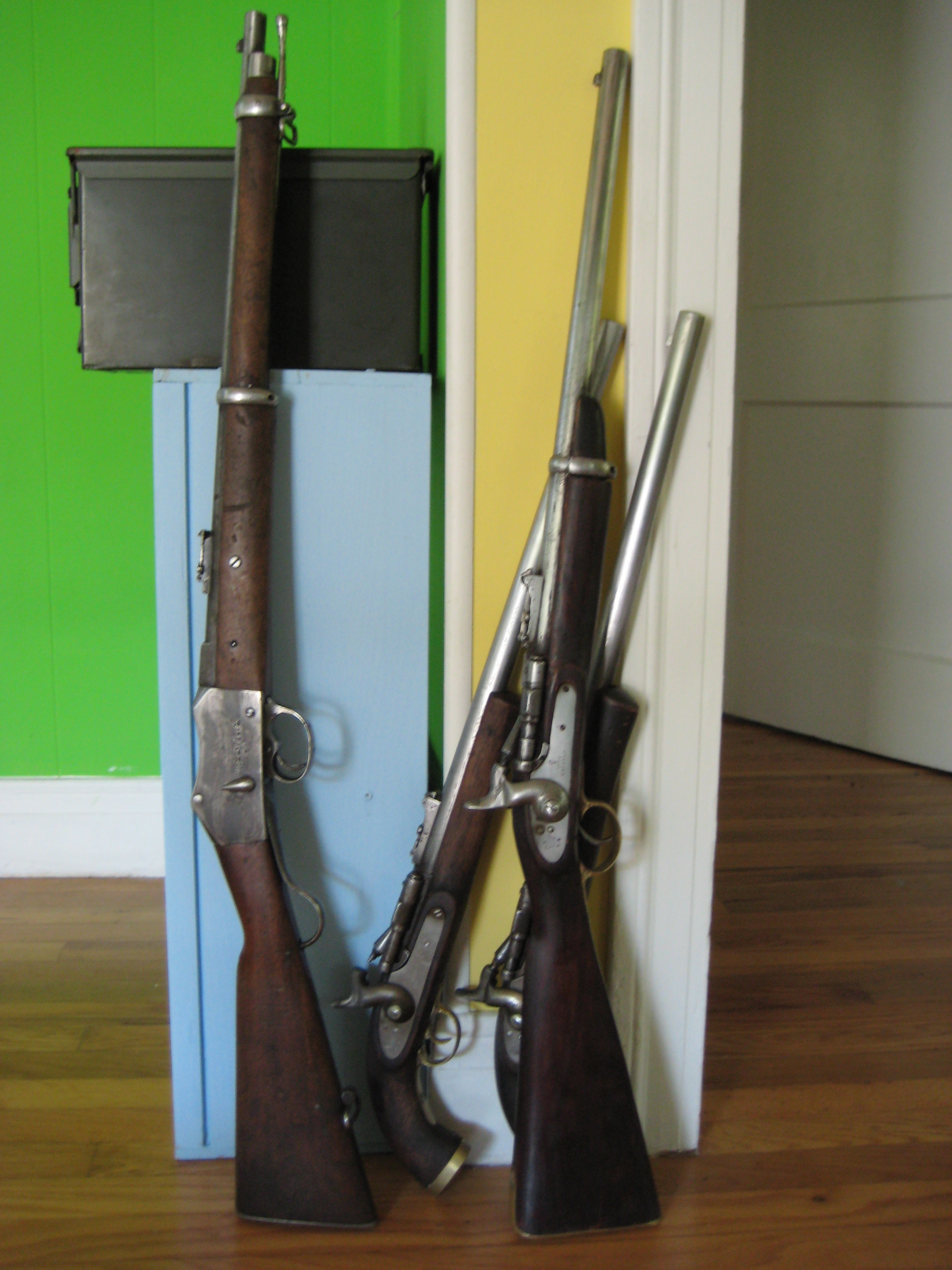
Copies of British Martini and Snider firearms built in the Khyber region

A Khyber Pass copy is a firearm manufactured by cottage gunsmiths in the Khyber Pass region in Pakistan.

The area has long had a reputation for producing unlicensed copies of firearms using whatever materials are available; more often than not, railway rails, scrap motor vehicles, and other scrap metal with basic hand tools. The quality of such firearms varies widely, ranging from as good as a factory-produced example to dangerously poor.

== Models ==
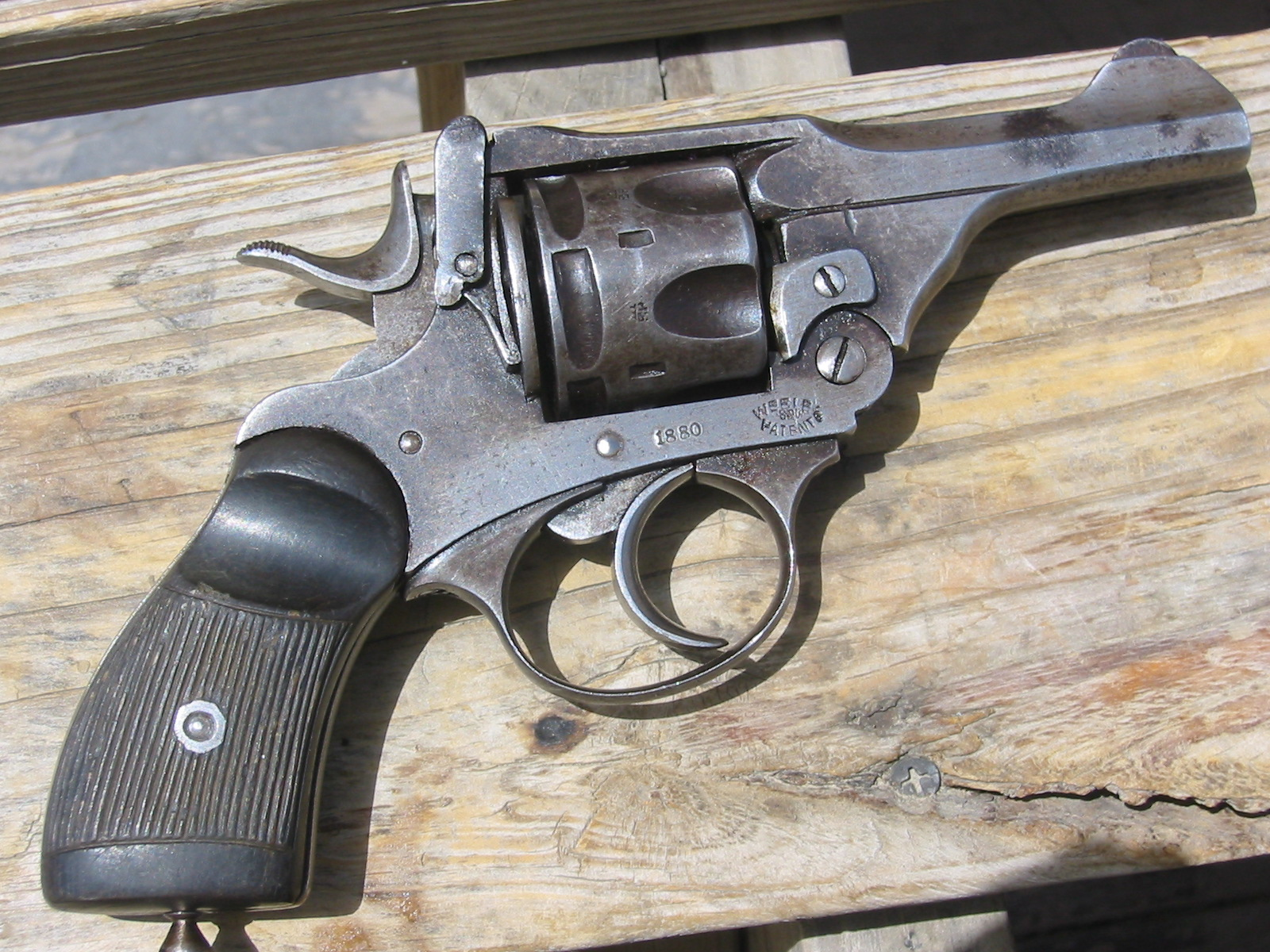
Copy of Webley Pocket Pistol in .38 S&W, purchased at Bagram Airfield, Afghanistan

The most commonly encountered Khyber Pass copies are of British military firearms, notably Martini–Henry, Martini–Enfield, and Lee–Enfield rifles, although AK-47 rifles, Webley Revolvers, Tokarev TT-33s, Colt M1911s and Browning Hi-Powers have also been encountered. In the United States, a Kalashnikov-style rifle composed of a mix of parts from various AK-style rifles is sometimes referred to as a Khyber Pass AK (PK-10) and copies of AK-103 (PK-21) because, like Khyber guns, they are unlike any rifle produced by a factory or issued by a regular military force. The typical example of a "Khyber Pass AK" is a stamped AKM receiver chambered for the 7.62×39mm cartridge, fitted with the triangular folding stock common to Russian AKS-74 rifles.

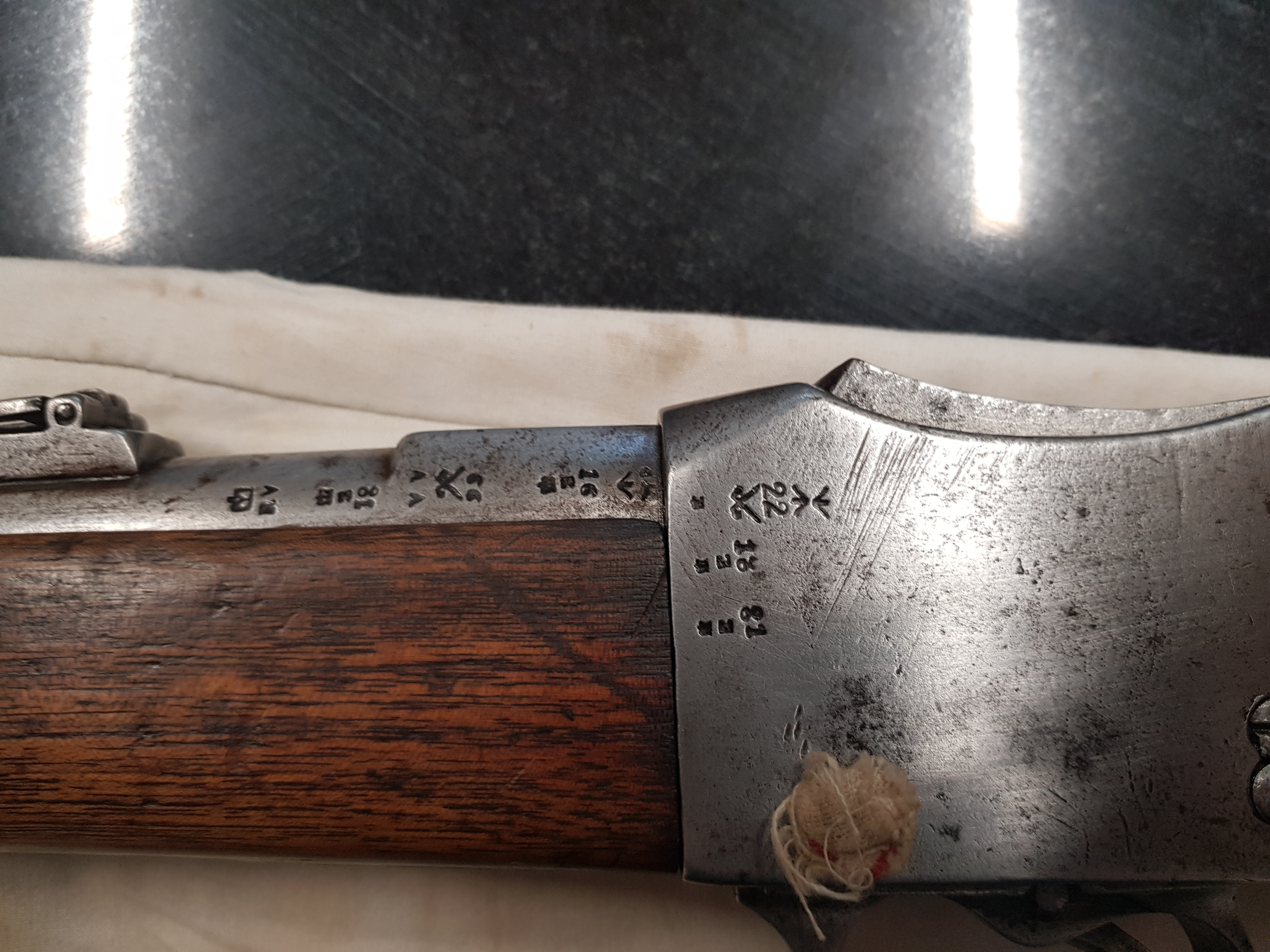
Khyber Pass copy of a Martini Enfield MK11 cavalry carbine, captured from a Taliban stockpile in 2001

The Khyber Pass gunsmiths first acquired examples of the various British service arms during nineteenth-century British military expeditions in the North-West Frontier, which they used to make copies. During World War II, some locally organised irregular forces were issued Khyber Pass-made rifles – partly for financial reasons, and partly because there was concern that the troops would steal their rifles and desert if they were issued higher-quality British- or Indian-manufactured rifles.

Some Khyber Pass copies such as the Martini-Henry MK11 (pictured) fell into the hands of the Taliban, and were soon captured by opposing forces and sent home. Khyber Pass gunsmiths go to great lengths to replicate firearms, down to minute details such as proof markings.

== Identification ==
External videos
- Khyber Pass Martini Pistol at RIA

Khyber Pass rifles are usually copied exactly from a "master" weapon (which may itself be a Khyber Pass copy), markings and all. It is not uncommon to see Khyber Pass rifles with numerous errors and particular identifying factors, notably:

- Spelling errors in the markings (the most common of which is EИFIELD for ENFIELD)
- V.R. (Victoria Regina) cyphers dated after 1901 – Queen Victoria died in 1901, so any rifles made after this should be stamped "E.R." (Edward Rex, referring to King Edward VII)
- Generally inferior workmanship, including weak or soft metal, poorly finished wood, and poorly struck markings.

Afghanistan was a point of conflict between the British Empire and Imperial Russia throughout the 19th century, from which it is reasonable to assume that tools and expertise relevant to both cultures were accumulated by local gunsmiths. Rather than a translation error, a reversed "N" or "L" in ENFIELD may be the Cyrillic "И" or "Г" character, with the gunsmith using whichever available letter punch best resembled the original letters.

== Ammunition ==
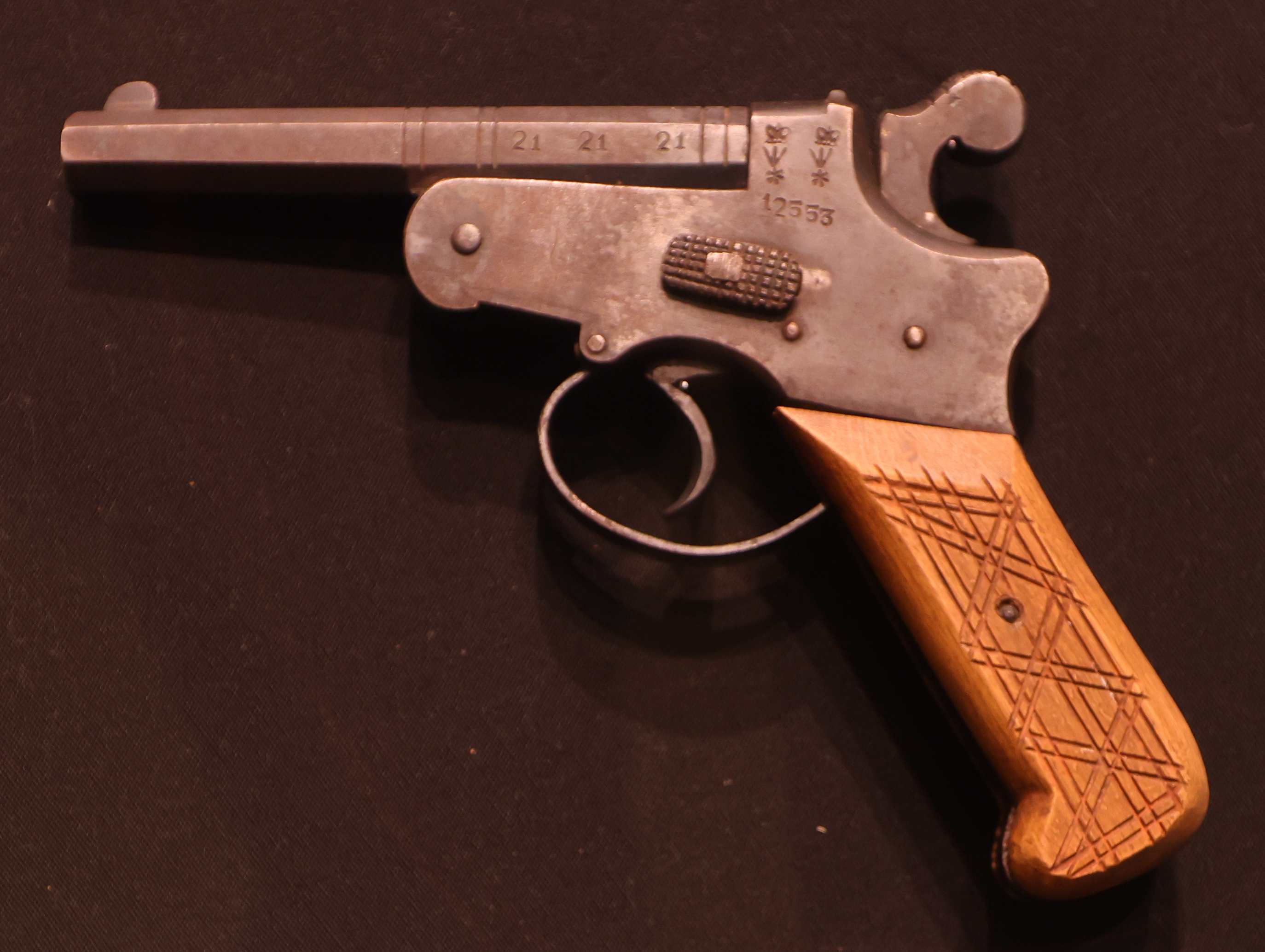
WW2 era Khyber Pass pistol

Along with firearm copies, cottage gunsmiths usually also produce corresponding ammunition. Typically they are based on low-powered modern cartridges. Calibre .30 bore cartridges are compatible with 7.63×25mm Mauser or 7.62×25mm Tokarev, .32 bore cartridges are compatible with .32 Auto Colt Pistol (7.65mm Browning [7.65×17mmSR]), and 12 bore cartridges are compatible with 12 gauge (18.5x70mmR) shotgun shells.

.44 bore cartridges are compatible with the 7.92×33mm Kurz cartridge made for the World War II era German StG 44 assault rifle. Pakistan has a ban on rifles designed to fire military cartridges; the use of the 44 bore cartridge was a loophole in the law until specifically banned in 2012. It was used in AKM copies chambered or modified for it. It was a popular cartridge because it was easy to modify AKMs to fire it but still fed from standard AK magazines. Saquib brand makes 44 bore ammunition.

The ammunition used in the Khyber Pass region is often underloaded, being made from a variety of powders or even old film (which contains nitrocellulose, a key component of smokeless powder); Khyber Pass copy rifles cannot be expected to withstand the pressures generated by modern commercial ammunition. A few collectors have made extremely mild handloaded cartridges for their Khyber Pass rifles and fired them, at substantial personal risk.

The packaging and headstamps are often forged versions of quality foreign brands like GECO (Gustav Genschow & Co.), Golden Tiger (Vympel IIRC), China Sport (NORINCO), MEN (Metallwerk Elisenhütte Nassau), and PPU (Prvi Partizan Užice). Local counterfeits have colorful brand-name packaging like Buffalo, Diamond, Double Dragon, Double Star, Federal SKF, Goodluck, Gorilla, and Tiger SBR.

The Khyber Arms Company, a local ammunition manufacturer, makes the Expert or X-Pert brand. It uses counterfeit Winchester ammunition packaging with cartridges stamped with fake NORINCO State Factory 311 headstamps.

New casings and bullet jackets are usually copper-washed steel, like Chinese ammunition. The casings are sometimes recycled from scrounged US or NATO military brass casings. 5.56mm NATO cases are cut-down and reshaped to make .30 bore rounds such as 7.63×25mm Mauser or 7.62×25mm Tokarev. 9×19mm Parabellum cases are cut down to make reloaded .380 ACP / 9×17mm Short or 9×18mm Makarov rounds.

== See also ==
- Antique firearms
- Arms industry
- Artisan
- Cottage industry
- Counterfeit consumer goods
- Darra Adam Khel
- Gun culture in Pakistan
- Jezail
- Paltik
- Replica
- Saturday night special
- Carlo (submachine gun)
