= Gun law in Pakistan =

Laws concerning firearm usage in Pakistan

Gun laws in Pakistan allow for the ownership of firearms in the country by the general population. Pakistan is one of the biggest open firearms markets in the world, and is in the modern era also known for its indigenous gunsmith tradition. The country is famous for producing clones of almost every notable weapon of the world. Although firearms are widely owned, heavy weaponry is permitted only in tribal areas within the province of Khyber Pakhtunkhwa. This includes the circulation of rocket-propelled grenades, short, medium, and long-range rockets, anti-aircraft guns, mortars and other types of firearms.

Firearms usage in cities and provinces is generally viewed as being for protection and sport. In contrast, many people in the Khyber Pakhtunkhwa, Baluchistan and rural areas of Punjab and Sindh view it as a distinct part of their culture. Enduring customs promote the prevalence and importance of guns. In Khyber Pakhtunkhwa, where the Pashtun residents laud performances of strength and toughness, carrying an AK-47 or other gun is a sign of honor and respect. Aerial firing is very common on special occasions such as weddings and festivals, despite being illegal.

The town of Darra Adam Khel, near Peshawar, is a notable center for gun manufacturing historically, and is known for its Lee–Enfield, 303 facsimiles and other Khyber Pass copies. However, the town now produces a broader range of weapons including AK-47's, mini-Kalashnikovs, and hand-held firearms, including the "James Bond" pen gun.

== History ==
There is little public debate in Pakistan on gun control.

In no particular order, Pakistanis view weapons as important for one or more of these purposes:

- Facilitating a natural right of self-defence.
- Participating in law enforcement.
- Enabling the people to organise a militia system.
- Suppressing insurrection.

== Ownership ==
An estimated 20 million firearms were owned by the public in 2012, of which 7 million were registered, among Pakistan's population of 200 million.

According to the Small Arms Survey of 2017, an estimated 44 million firearms were owned by the public, of which 6 million were registered. The rate of private gun ownership is 22.3 firearms per 100 people. In a comparison of the number of privately owned guns in 230 countries, Pakistan ranks 24th in the world. As of 2018, the homicide rate is 3.8 per 100,000 population, lower than the United States at 4.96 per 100,000 population.

== Legal framework ==
The main law dealing with firearm possession, sales, and purchase in Pakistan is the Pakistan Arms Ordinance of 1965. It gives the federal government power to establish rules for issuing firearm licenses via notification in the Official Gazette. After the 18th amendment in the constitution, provinces in Pakistan received the right to make their own regulations and rules. Sindh, Punjab, and Khyber Paktunkhwa have all published their own regulations and rules related to firearms. The Ministry of Commerce controls the import of weapons and issues policy for importing guns into the country.

== Licensing of firearms ==
Pakistani citizens and a special category of foreigners can legally own guns and a license is required in order to purchase a firearm. Acquisition of the license involves the payment of fees, a processing time ranging from a few days to months, and the registration of the firearm with the relevant local authority. Two kinds of licenses are currently issued in Pakistan:

(1) Prohibited Bore

(2) Non-Prohibited Bore.

They are issued by both the federal government and provincial governments. The federal government issues both Prohibited Bore licenses (which includes fully automatic weapons) and Non-Prohibited Bore licenses (which includes semi-automatic and other weapons). Issued licenses are valid and can be used in the whole of Pakistan. Federal Prohibited Bore licenses for civilians issued by the Ministry of the Interior are also valid throughout Pakistan. After the 18th amendment, federal government jurisdiction for both license types is restricted to federal government employees, federal government officials, defense forces personnel, and federal government institutions.

Different provinces can also issue licenses as per their respective policies. After the 18th amendment in 2010, provincial governments also have the ability to issue Prohibited Bore licenses.

People can apply for firearms licenses as per the relevant policy in their province.

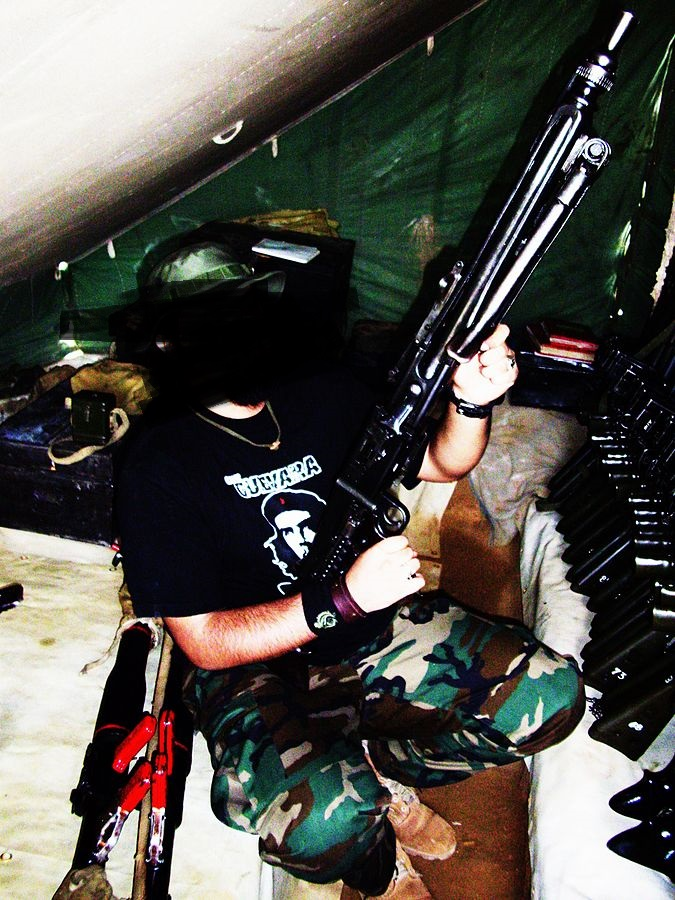
A Pakistani built MG-3

=== Non-Prohibited Bore weapons and licenses ===
The gazette notification dated June 7, 2013, published by the Pakistani Ministry of Interior defines prohibited and non-prohibited weapons. After the 18th amendment, the right to issue arms licenses was transferred to provinces. Nevertheless, federal government jurisdiction for licensing remained within Islamabad and for employees, officials, institutions of federal government and for defense personnel. Different provinces issue arms licenses following their respective policies .

=== Prohibited Bore weapons and licenses ===
After the 18th amendment, different provinces made their own arms regulations and rules, and published their own list of prohibited and non-prohibited firearms by an official gazette notification.

In November 2017, the interior ministry announced that automatic weapons were banned and all lawful owners were required to turn them into semi-automatic weapons or surrender them to authorities by 15 January 2018. However, on 14 December 2018, the government reversed the ban reinstating all Prohibited Bore licenses that were previously suspended. Issuance of new PB licenses has been limited to top-ranking government officials and top-ranking defense personnel.

== Local regulations ==
=== Balochistan ===
Until now, Balochistan has not made its own arms act or rules and is still following the Pakistan arms ordnance 1965. Consequently, the Balochistan regional government is issuing non prohibited firearms licenses for residents of Balochistan. There is currently no quota limit, and the power to issue arms licenses is with district authorities.

=== Khyber Pakhtunkhwa ===
Arms rules in Khyber Pakhtunkhwa from 2014, state that firearm licenses can be granted to any citizen of Pakistan and resident of the province. An applicant must be aged 21 or over and possess a national card. Further checks are also carried out into the history of an individual's mental health and whether or not the individual has previously committed a criminal offence. Authorities will consider general suitability in view of general conduct in line with relevant local government policy. The law specifies that the government may establish a maximum number of licenses that may be issued in the state. Civilian possession of NBP firearm requires the filling of form XVII. An applicant must specify a reason to own a weapon – such as for sports, protection, display, or other reason – with a simple declaration. The government is also issuing prohibited restricted bore licenses to selected individuals.

=== Punjab ===
After the 89th amendment, Punjab issued its arms rules in 2014 and these were later modified in 2017. The Punjab government also published its own list of prohibited and non prohibited firearms by gazette motivation on 10 June 2015. The Punjabi government has created a national database authority (NADRA) in order to keep a digital record of all personal arms licenses, and the old paper-based licenses were converted into chip-based smart cards. The digitization of the records of arms dealers is also in progress. New personal arms licenses are currently banned for common citizens, but open for government officials and selected professionals. The minimum age to hold a personal license was 25 in the province of Punjab up until 2023. Recently the age limit was again amended and reduced to 20 years of age.

=== Sindh ===
In September 2003, the government of Sindh banned the issuing of new licenses. In January 2009, the Sindh High Court ordered the government to establish a policy on issuing new NPB ( PB License can only be issued by Federal Government) licenses. The age limit is 25 years. The ban was subsequently lifted on 22 November 2009, and new licenses are now being issued on a quota basis.

=== Islamabad Capital Territory ===
On 3 May 2018, Islamabad lifted the ban on the issuing of arms licenses that had been in place since 2013. Up to 100 licenses were permitted to be issued every month.

== Firearms sale, dealerships, and registration ==
In Pakistan, the private sale and transfer of firearms is prohibited. The commercial dealing of firearms without a valid gun dealer's license is also unlawful. For dealing in firearms, a dealership license issued by the respective provincial authorities is required. Licensed firearms dealers are allowed to import firearms from abroad but heavy customs duties are imposed on imported firearms. In Pakistan, the law requires that a record of the acquisition, possession, and transfer of each privately held firearm be retained on an official register. Licensed firearm dealers are also required to keep a record of firearms or ammunition purchases, sales, or transfers for the regulating authority. Finally, licensed gun makers are required to keep a record of each firearm produced, for inspection by a regulating authority. State agencies are required to maintain records of the storage and movement of all firearms and ammunition under their control. There is a strict check on firearms dealers in Punjab and Sindh, and Punjab was the first province that regulated the firearms trade through establishing a computerised database of firearms dealers. Furthermore, the government of Punjab is creating an online dealers' listing through NADRA and is creating an online Biometric inventory module for all firearms dealers.

== Carrying firearms ==
=== Gun-free zones ===
In Pakistan, private guns are prohibited in a range of public and private spaces including educational institutions, hostels, boarding and lodging houses, fairs, gatherings, or processions of a political, religious, ceremonial, or sectarian character, and on the premises of courts of law or public offices.

=== Carrying weapons ===
The open carrying of firearms is considered to be a misdemeanor in Pakistan. A person may keep a firearm at their place of residence (including for display on the rooftops of private residences), in their vehicle, and through concealed carry. According to the law, open carrying is prohibited without the approval of the concerned authority but is still practiced in some areas, such as the rural areas of Khyber-Pakhtunkhwa and Balochistan. Special permits are also required for carrying firearms during times when local authorities impose restrictions on public gatherings in order to preempt civil unrest, or during protests that are expected to become violent. Target shooting facilities and shooting galleries exist in major cities for gun enthusiasts to practice. In 2015, the government of Punjab banned the open carrying of licensed weapons with a minimum penalty of two years in prison.

== Age limit for arms licence ==
After the 18th amendment, different provinces have made their own arms regulations and arms rules. The minimum age limit for a firearms licence therefore varies from province to province. In Punjab, the minimum age for an arms licences was set to 25 years in 2017. Later in 2023 Punjab has reverted the age limit policy back to 20 meaning an eligible applicant, possessing a national identity card and being 20 years of age may have the right to apply for a personal licence through DC or Home department via NADRA (PALS) as per eligibility.

== Penalty for illicit firearm possession ==
In Pakistan, the penalty for illicit possession of firearms ranges between 7 and 14 years of imprisonment.

== Collection, amnesty and destruction programmes ==
Authorities in Pakistan are known to have implemented voluntary firearm surrender schemes, as well as weapon seizure programs. These have been created in order to reduce the number of illicit firearms in circulation. In 2010 alone, more than 89,000 illegal firearms were voluntarily surrendered by Pakistani citizens for destruction. The total number of firearms destroyed following recent state amnesties, collection, and seizure programs is reported to be 641,107. The Pakistani military routinely captures weapons seized from the Taliban and other insurgents and stores them in their storage facilities.
