= Zastava M70 (pistol) =

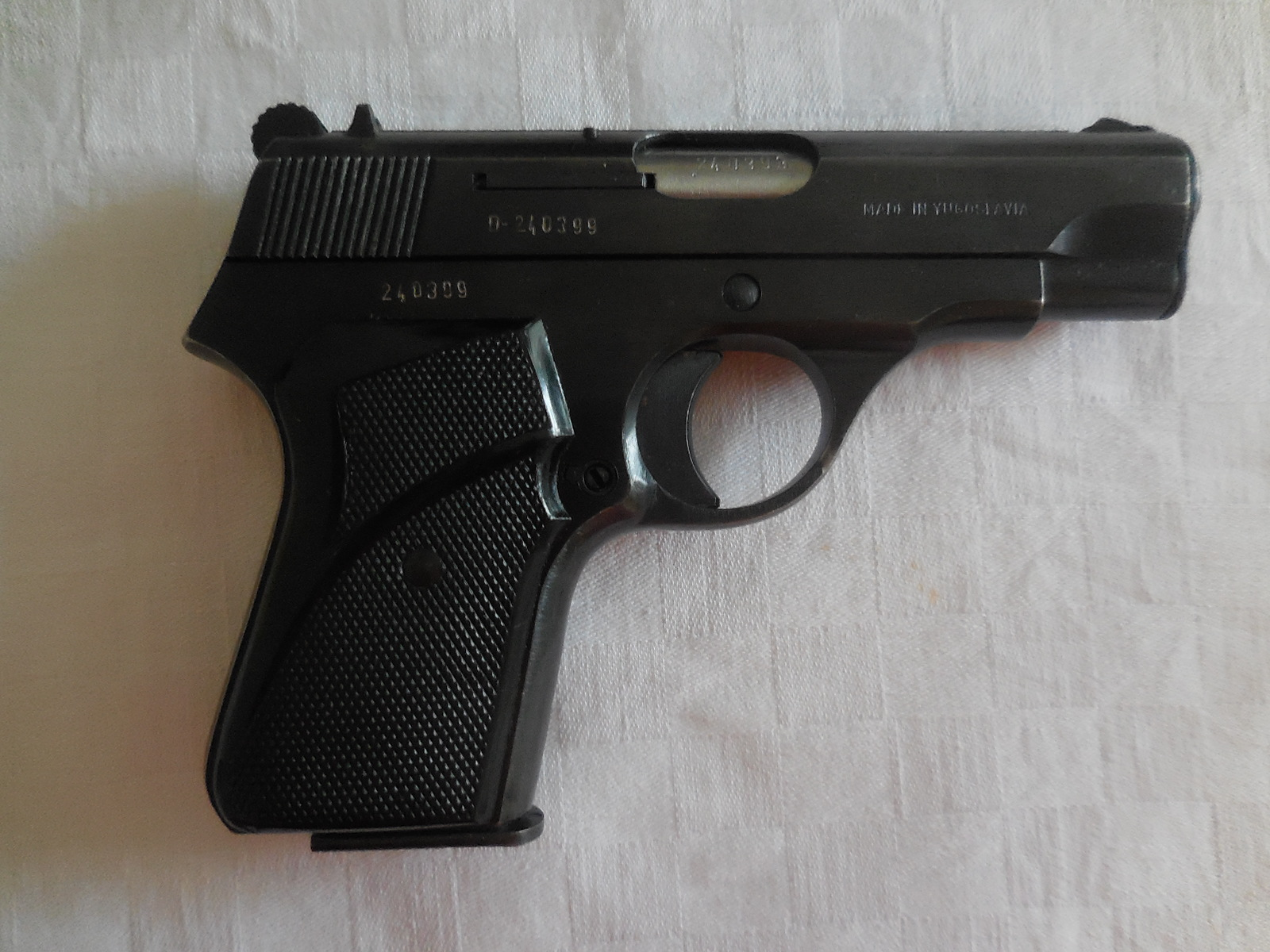
- Type: Semi-automatic pistol
- Place of origin: Yugoslavia/Serbia

Service history
- Wars: Yugoslav Wars

Production history
- Designed: 1970
- Manufacturer: Zastava Arms
- Produced: 1970–present

Specifications
- Mass: 670 grams
- Length: 165mm
- Barrel length: 94mm
- Height: 115mm
- Cartridge: .32 ACP (7.65 mm) 9mm Kratak (.380 ACP)
- Muzzle velocity: 300m/s (7.65mm), 260m/s (9mm Short)
- Effective firing range: 30m
- Feed system: 8 (7.65mm) or 7 (9mm Short) round single-stack magazine
- Sights: Iron sights

The Zastava M70, formerly designated CZ M70 (Serbo-Croatian: Crvena Zastava Model 1970, Црвена Застава Модел 1970) is a semi-automatic pistol produced by Zastava Arms as a sidearm for Yugoslav police and certain military officers. The pistol was loosely based on the Zastava M57, but is scaled down to accept the smaller and less powerful 7,65mm Browning (.32 ACP) or 9mm Kratak (.380 ACP).

== Design details ==
The M70 is a simple-blowback operated, single-action, pistol. This model differs most significantly from the locked-breech M57 by employing simple blowback, as this method is suitable for less powerful ammunition. Other differences from the parent M57 are found in the safety mechanisms, with both a manual safety lever and a magazine disconnect being present. The manual safety lever is located on the left side of the frame, above the grip panel, and flips forward to fire and back to engage the safety.

Owing to its Tokarev design lineage, the pistol is easy to disassemble and the hammer assembly is removable as one piece. The sights are fixed, with the rear sight being drift-adjustable for windage.

== Users ==
For many years these pistols were used by Yugoslavian police and military. Today many of these pistols are sold worldwide as surplus and are popular among civilians in Serbia, sometimes referred as "Pčelica" (little bee).
