= TT pistol =

TT
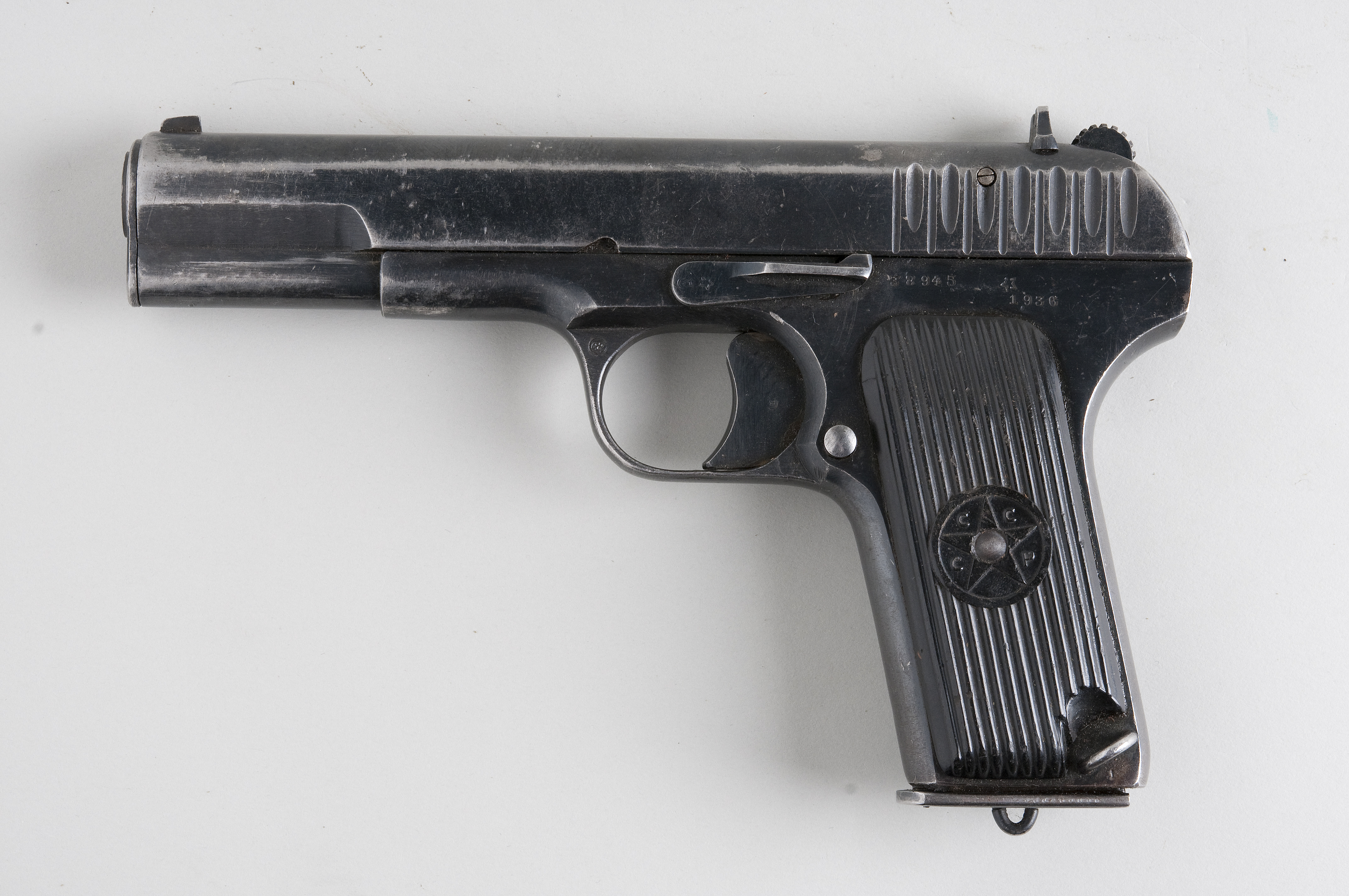
- TT-33
- Type: Semi-automatic pistol
- Place of origin: Soviet Union

Service history
- In service: 1930–present
- Used by: See Users
- Wars: See Conflicts

Production history
- Designer: Fedor Tokarev
- Designed: 1930
- Manufacturer: Tula Arms Plant; Izhevsk Arsenal; Norinco; FÉG; FB Radom; Cugir Arms Factory; Chongyul Arms Plant; Z111 Factory; Zastava Arms
- Produced: 1930–1955 (in Soviet Union)
- No. built: 1,653,188 (Note: TT-30 and T-33 produced between 1930 and 1945.)
- Variants: See variants

Specifications
- Mass: 854 g (30.1 oz)
- Length: 195 mm (7.7 in)
- Barrel length: 116 mm (4.6 in)
- Height: 134 mm (5.3 in)
- Cartridge: 7.62×25mm Tokarev; 9×19mm Parabellum
- Action: Short recoil actuated, locked breech, single action
- Muzzle velocity: 420 m/s (1,378 ft/s)
- Effective firing range: 50 m (55 yd)
- Feed system: 8-round detachable box magazine
- Sights: Front blade, rear notch 156 mm (6.1 in) sight radius

The TT-30, (Note: Russian: 7,62-мм самозарядный пистолет Токарева образца 1930 года, romanized: 7,62 mm Samozaryadny Pistolet Tokareva obraztsa 1930 goda, "7.62 mm Tokarev self-loading pistol model 1930", TT stands for Tula-Tokarev)) officially the Tula Tokarev-30, commonly known simply as the TT or Tokarev, is a semi-automatic pistol designed and produced in the Soviet Union. The TT was designed by Fedor Tokarev and served as the service pistol of the Soviet Armed Forces and Militsiya from 1931 to 1951.

The TT was developed in the late 1920s to replace the Nagant M1895 and based on the designs of John Moses Browning, with detail modifications to simplify production and maintenance. It saw service by Soviet forces in many conflicts during the 1930s and 1940s, including World War II. The TT was replaced by the Makarov pistol due to criticism over its size, weight, usability and lack of a safety. Production of the TT in the Soviet Union ceased in 1954, but derivatives continued to be manufactured for many years in China and Yugoslavia. It is one of the most-produced firearms in the world, with at least 1,700,000 manufactured, and continues to be in widespread active service by militaries and police forces.

== Development ==
Before 1930, the Soviet Union used a large variety of foreign-made semi-automatic pistols including: FN M1900, FN M1903, FN M1905, M1921 "Bolo" Mauser, and the Colt M1911, besides the Nagant M1895 revolver. In an attempt to simplify production, the Soviet Artillery Committee (which also oversaw small arms designs) decided to adopt a 7.62 mm pistol caliber, allowing Mosin-Nagant rifle barrels to be cut down to make pistols and submachine gun barrels. In 1930, the Red Army conducted trials to select a new standard-issue pistol and Tokarev's design was tested against upscaled versions of the Korovin pistol, and Sergei Aleksandrovich Prilutsky's 1920−1921 self-loading design as well as foreign pistols. (Note: According to Yelshin, some of the foreign pistols tested included designs from Browning and Walther (Yelshin 1981, p. 36)) Tokarev's design, considered to be lighter, more accurate and reliable than its competitors (despite being harder to disassemble), was adopted as the Tula-Tokarev Model 1930, even though the pistol would only be officially adopted in the next year.

After being accepted for service, the TT-30 was modified, primarily to simplify the manufacturing process, such as making the back strap an integral part of the frame instead of being a separate piece, reducing machining time. The newly improved pistol received the designation TT-33.

== Design details ==
Externally, the TT-33 is very similar to John Browning's blowback operated FN Model 1903 pistol, and internally it uses Browning's short recoil tilting-barrel system from the M1911 pistol. In other areas the TT-33 differs more from Browning's designs—it employs a much simpler hammer/sear assembly than the M1911. This assembly is removable from the pistol as a modular unit and includes machined magazine feed lips, preventing misfeeds when a damaged magazine is loaded into the magazine well. The magazines themselves can be disassembled for cleaning, another measure to prevent malfunctions.

The pistol lacks an external safety and is usually carried with a round loaded and the hammer half-cocked. The safest method for carrying the TT-33 is to leave the chamber empty, though it requires the slide to be manually pulled back and released to ready the gun for use, which takes some effort due to the relatively stiff recoil spring.

The TT-33 is chambered for the 7.62×25mm Tokarev cartridge, which was itself based on the similar 7.63×25mm Mauser cartridge used in the Mauser C96 pistol. The 7.62×25mm cartridge is powerful, has an extremely flat trajectory, and is capable of penetrating thick clothing and soft body armor. Despite the power of the 7.62 mm round, the TT-33 has a relatively mild recoil.

Although the Tokarev was mass produced for the Red Army, the Soviet Union continued producing Nagant 1895 revolvers during World War II due to the material demands of the war and the shortcomings of the TT-33, including worse suitability for firing through a tank viewport, accidental release of magazines, and decreased pistol service life from stress on the firing pin. Due to the lack of an external safety, cavalry units including Cossacks carried Nagants as sidearms instead.

As early as 1938, the Soviets mulled on a replacement for the TT-33, and trials were conducted. After testing several designs, including a submission from Tokarev, an 18-round design chambered for the 7.62 mm round by Pavel V. Voyevodin (Voevodin pistol) was chosen, but development was halted after the Germans launched Operation Barbarossa.

Early production TTs have a high-quality black or dark blue finish, while wartime models (1942−1945) have rougher finish and wooden grips instead of rubber, while in some examples the lanyard ring on the bottom of the magazine was omitted. A total of 1,059,687 pistols were built during World War II, while approximately 46,000 were built post-war: these pistols have improved finish and grips similar to pre-war models. They also feature a slightly taller rear sight and narrow serrations on the rear of the slide.

== Variants ==
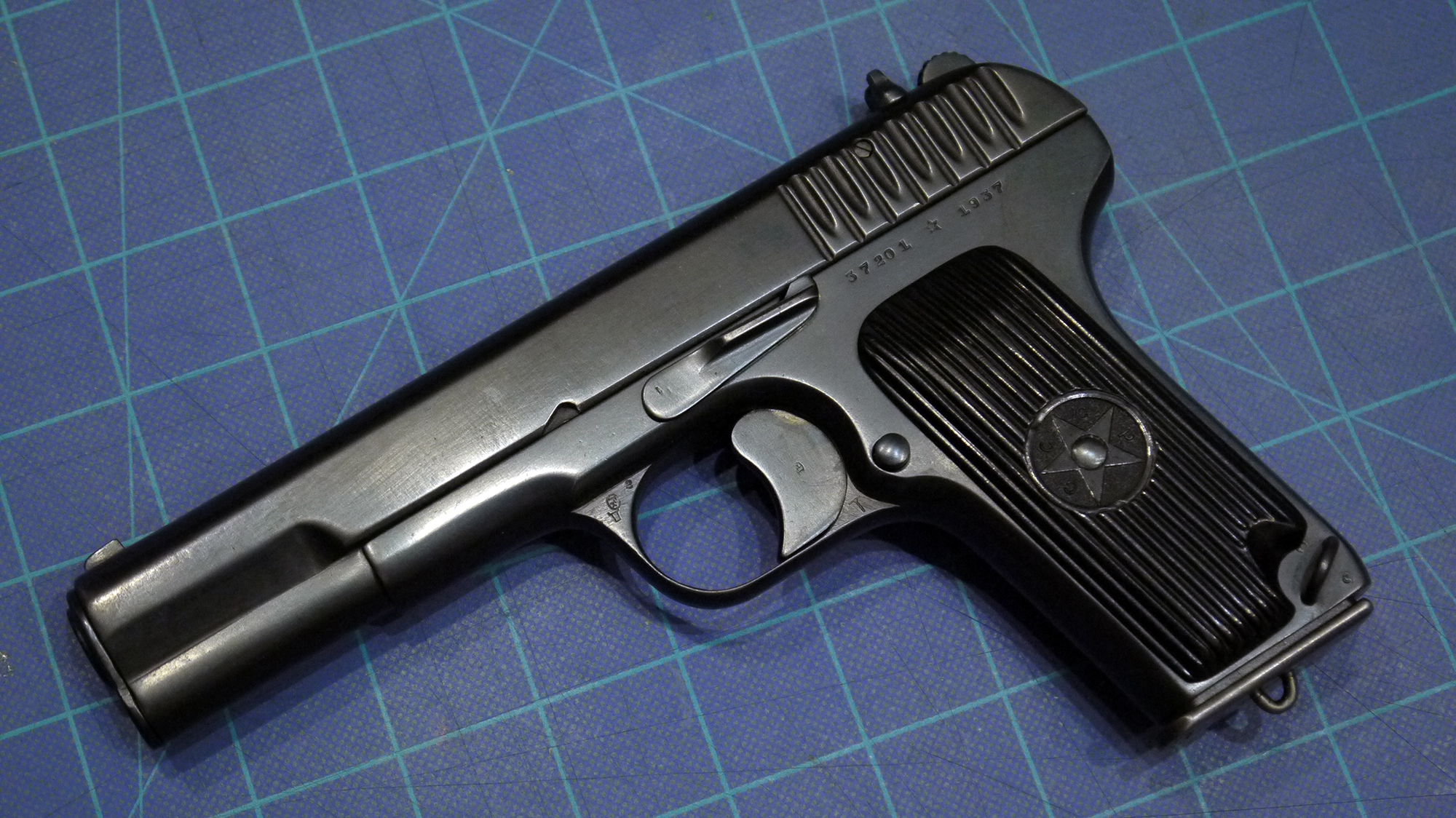
Soviet Tokarev TT-33, made in 1937

=== Soviet Union ===
- TT-30: Original model, adopted by the Soviet Union as standard military pistol in 1931 it is estimated that 93,000 pistols were built until 1936.
- TT-33: A modified and simplified version of the TT-30, it was replaced by the Makarov pistol. A civilian version of the T-33 was offered in the 2010s by the Molot Machine Building Plant. These pistols are externally similar to the original, but are chambered for 10×33mm cartridges containing a single rubber ball of 10 mm (0.39 in) diameter for self-defense purposes.
- TT-3: Training pistol chambered for .22 long rifle, it apparently never got past prototype stage.
- TT-4: Virtually identical to the TT-3, but with a longer barrel. Apparently never got past prototype stage.

=== China ===
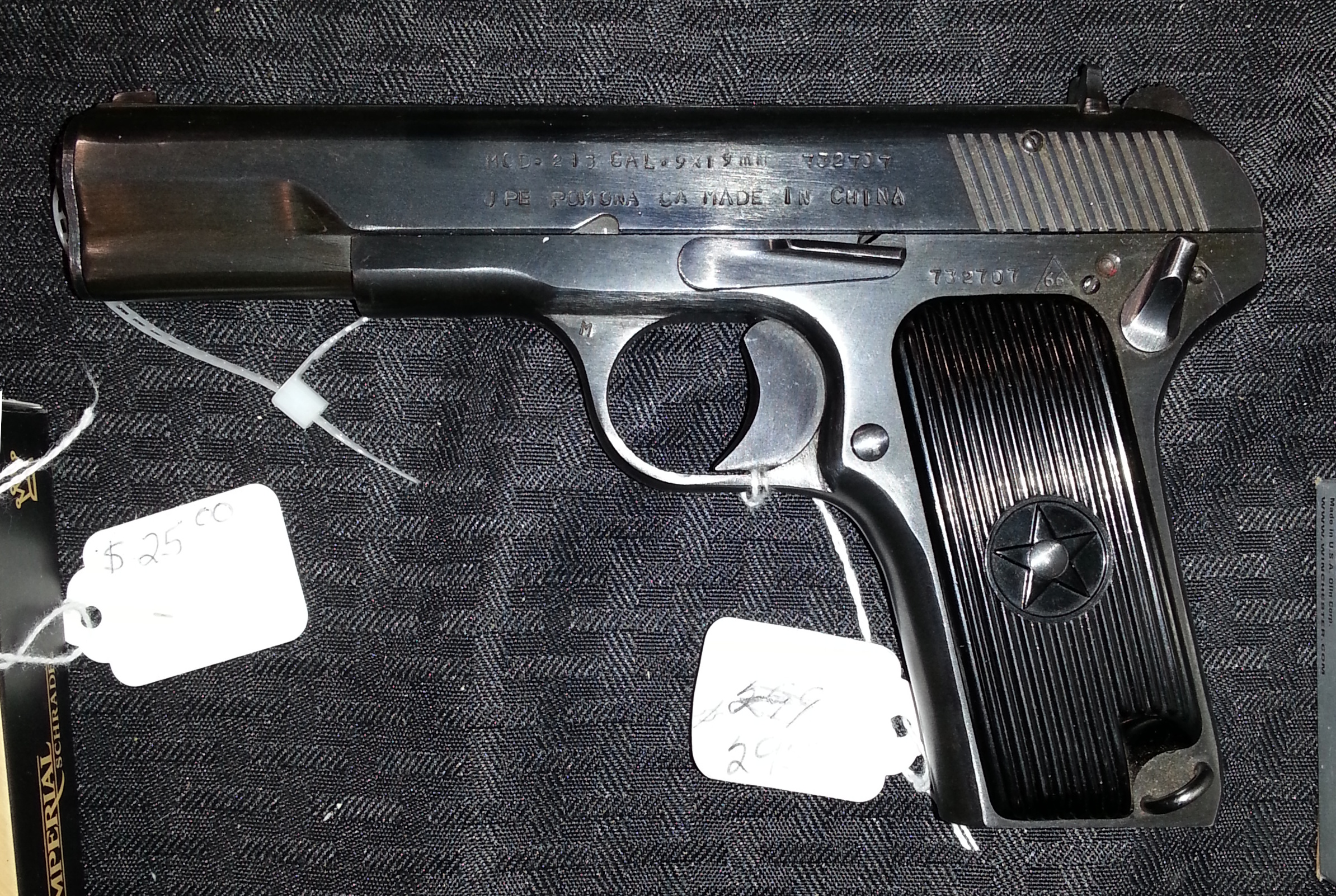
Type 54 with manual safety

- Type 51: A virtually identical copy of the TT-33, except for the Chinese markings on the left rear of the frame or on the top of the slide. According to Thompson, the barrels aren't chrome-lined. Over 235,000 were produced between 1951 and 1954.
- Type 54: Replaced the Type 51 in 1954. Roughly 420,000 were produced until 1985. Up to 50,000 Type 54s were exported to North Vietnam.
- M20: Basically a Type 54 with no markings for clandestine operations. At least some were supplied to the Viet Cong and the People's Army of Vietnam (PAVN). It's estimated that less than 50,000 were made.
- TU-20
- Model 213: Export model by Norinco, it's a Type 54 fitted with an external safety and chambered for the 9×19mm Parabellum round.
- Model 213A: A Model 213 with a 14-round box magazine.
- Model 213B: A Model 213 with a wrap-around grip to improve ergonomics.
- NP-10: Export model with interchangeable barrels. It can fire 7.62×25mm, 9×19mm, and .38 Super cartridges.
- NP-15: Export 9×19mm model with three white dot sights and a black rubber grip.
- NP-17: Export target-shooting 9×19mm pistol with a 116 mm (4.6 in) barrel and muzzle brake.

=== Hungary ===
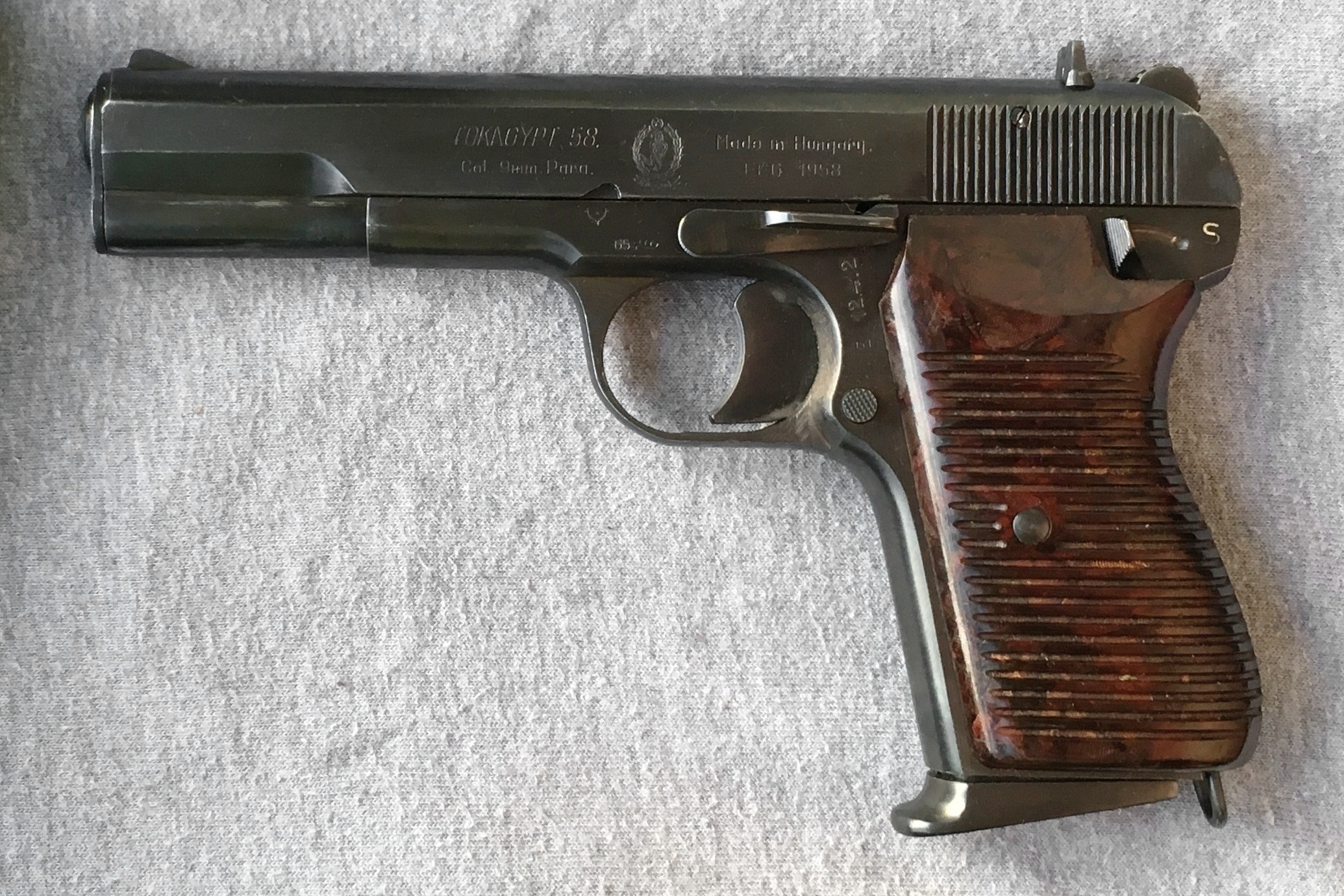
The Hungarian "Tokagypt" is a 9 mm variant of the Soviet TT pistol

- M48: Also commonly known as the 48M, the Pisztoly 48 Minta is a licensed copy of the TT-33 produced by Fegyver- és Gépgyár (FÉG) from 1948 until 1958. They can be identified by the Rákosi or Kádár crest on the grips. About 100,000 were manufactured.
- Tokagypt 58: An export version for Egypt chambered for the 9×19mm Parabellum round which was widely used by police forces there.

=== North Korea ===
- Type 68: Also known as the Type 66/68 and M68, it was produced at the Chongyul Arms Plant and can be distinguished from the TT-33 by the shorter barrel, (Note: The Type 66/68 has a 107 mm (4.2 in) long barrel in comparison to the TT-33's 116 mm (4.6 in) long barrel. (Thompson 2022, p. 67)) and the serrations on the rear of the slide, intended to give the shooter a grip while the gun is being cocked. Other differences include a magazine catch on the base of the grip, a tilting-barrel system similar to the Browning Hi-Power, a modified firing pin and reinforced slide stop. TT-33 magazines can be used on the Type 68, but not vice versa. During the 1980s the Type 68 was gradually replaced by the Baek Du San pistol, a North Korean copy of the Czechoslovak CZ 75 pistol.

=== Pakistan ===
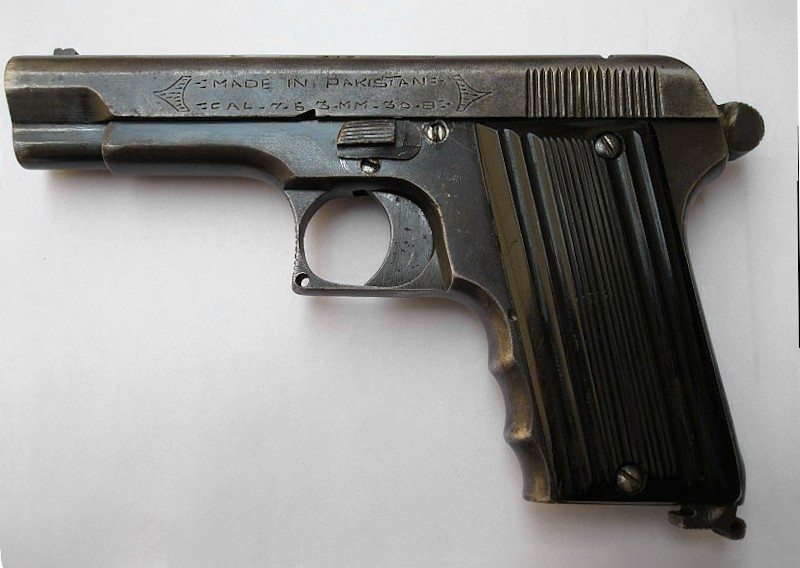
A crude Pakistani-made knockoff copy of the TT-33 Pistol.

- Khyber Pass copy: Both legal and illegal TT pistols are still manufactured in various Pakistani Khyber Pass factories. Quality greatly varies, with some individual copies being almost indistinguishable from the original. These copies usually can be identified by the incorrect markings or crude finish. Due to the high pressure generated by the 7.62×25mm cartridge and the often poor quality of the steel and heat treatment of these copies, they can be dangerous to fire.

=== Poland ===
- wz. 1933: A licensed copy designated as Pistolet wzór 1933, about 225,500 pistols were produced by FB "Łucznik" Radom from 1948 until 1955 following a limited production run in 1946−1947. It was replaced by the FB P-64 in 1967, though the wz. 1933 remained in limited service until the 1990s.
- TT Sportowy: .22 LR caliber training pistol that uses aluminum or brass inserts to hold the rimfire cartridges.

=== Romania ===
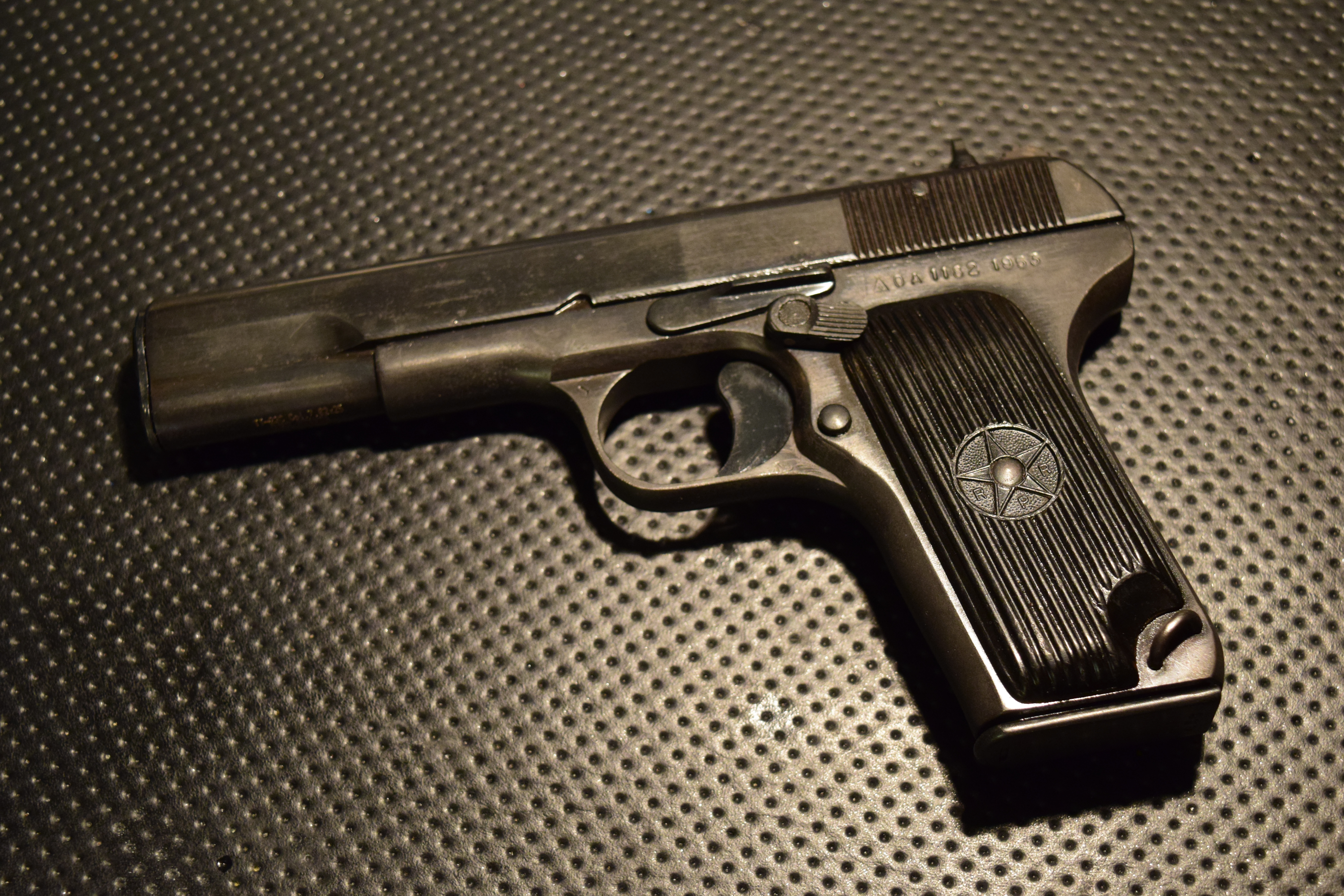
Romanian TTC, made in 1953

- TTC: Designated as the Tula Tokarev Cugir, it was produced by the Cugir Arms Factory. The first prototype was made in 1951, with mass production continuing until 1957. The TTC was adopted by the Romanian military in 1952 and remained in service (also with police units) until the late 1990s. 155,648 pistols were produced in total. Of these, about 30,000 were exported to Syria and Iraq, while a few thousand more were sold to other foreign customers.

=== Vietnam ===
- K-54VN: A locally produced copy made by Z111 Factory to replace and refurbish the aging Type 54 (designated as K-54 by the Vietnamese) pistols in service.
- K14: An upgraded version of the K-54VN also made by Z111 Factory, it has a barrel 11 mm (0.43 in) longer, an increased capacity of 13 rounds, with a wider grip to incorporate a double stack magazine. In early October 2014, the PAVN received 50 pistols for trials.

=== Yugoslavia / Serbia ===
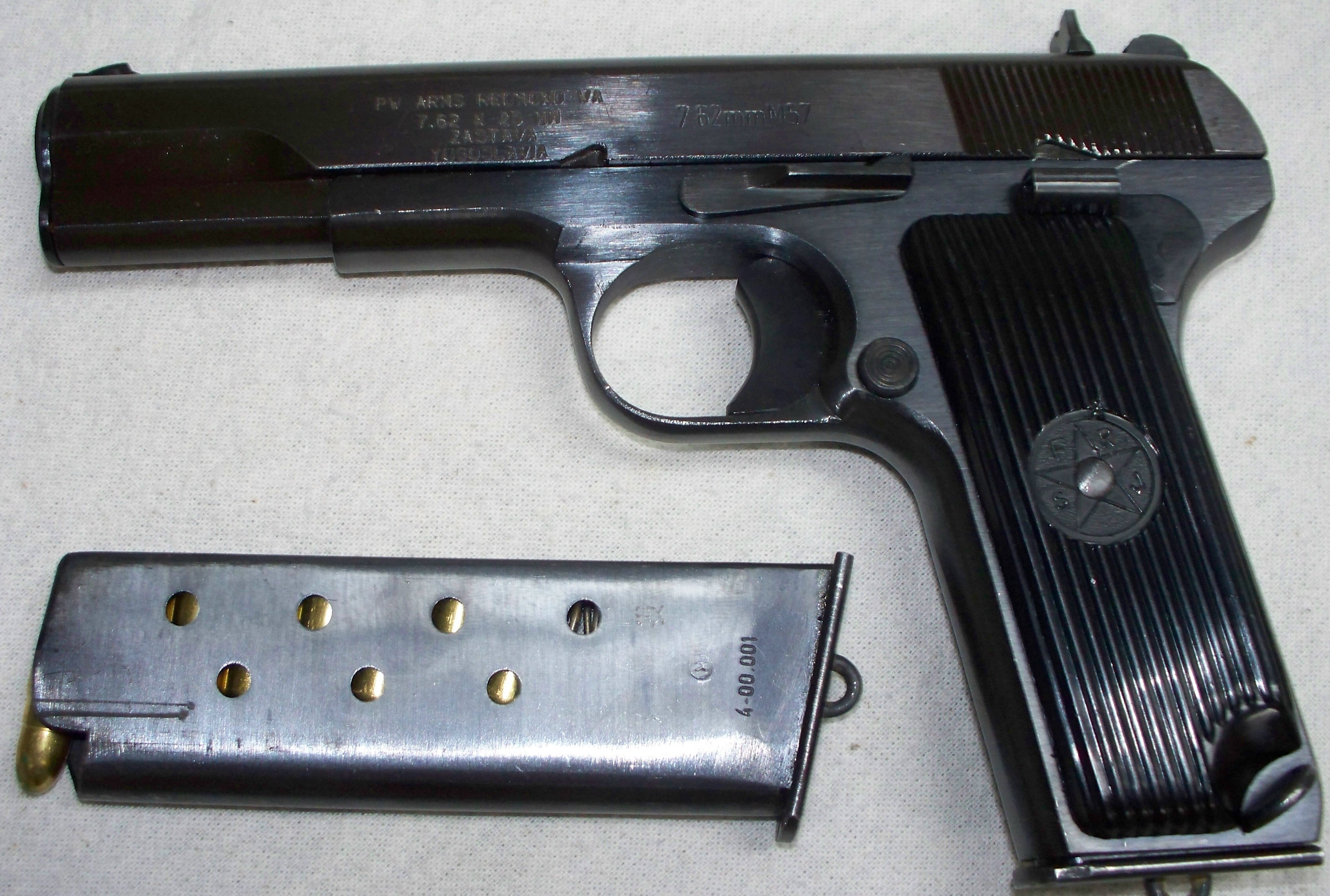
M57 with a loaded 9-round magazine.

- M57: The Zastava Model M57 is an improved copy of the TT-33 made by Zastava Arms, with a longer grip to accommodate a 9-round magazine (as opposed to the TT's eight), and a magazine safety, though the bore is not chromed. Around 260,000−270,000 pistols were produced between 1963 and 1982, with a separate run of pistols made for Croatia.
- M70: Not to be confused with the blowback M70 pistol also produced by Zastava, it's an M57 chambered for the 9×19mm cartridge. It uses a six-groove rifling instead of four.
- M70A: An improved version of the M70, it features a slide-mounted safety catch which locks the firing pin.
- M70: A blowback-operated pistol chambered for the .32 ACP cartridge, it features a manual safety to lock the firing mechanism and an automatic safety that blocks the sear when the magazine is removed.
- M70(k): A blowback pistol identical to the M70, but chambered for the .380 ACP cartridge.
- M88: A compact and modernized version of the M70 9×19mm pistol with a 8-round magazine. While it largely retains the Tokarev operating mechanism, externally it bears little resemblance to the TT-33. It features a frame-mounted safety.
- Zastava M88A: Virtually identical to the M88, but with a safety catch mounted on the rear of the slide, which not only blocks the firing pin, but also interrupts the link between trigger and hammer as well.

== Service history ==
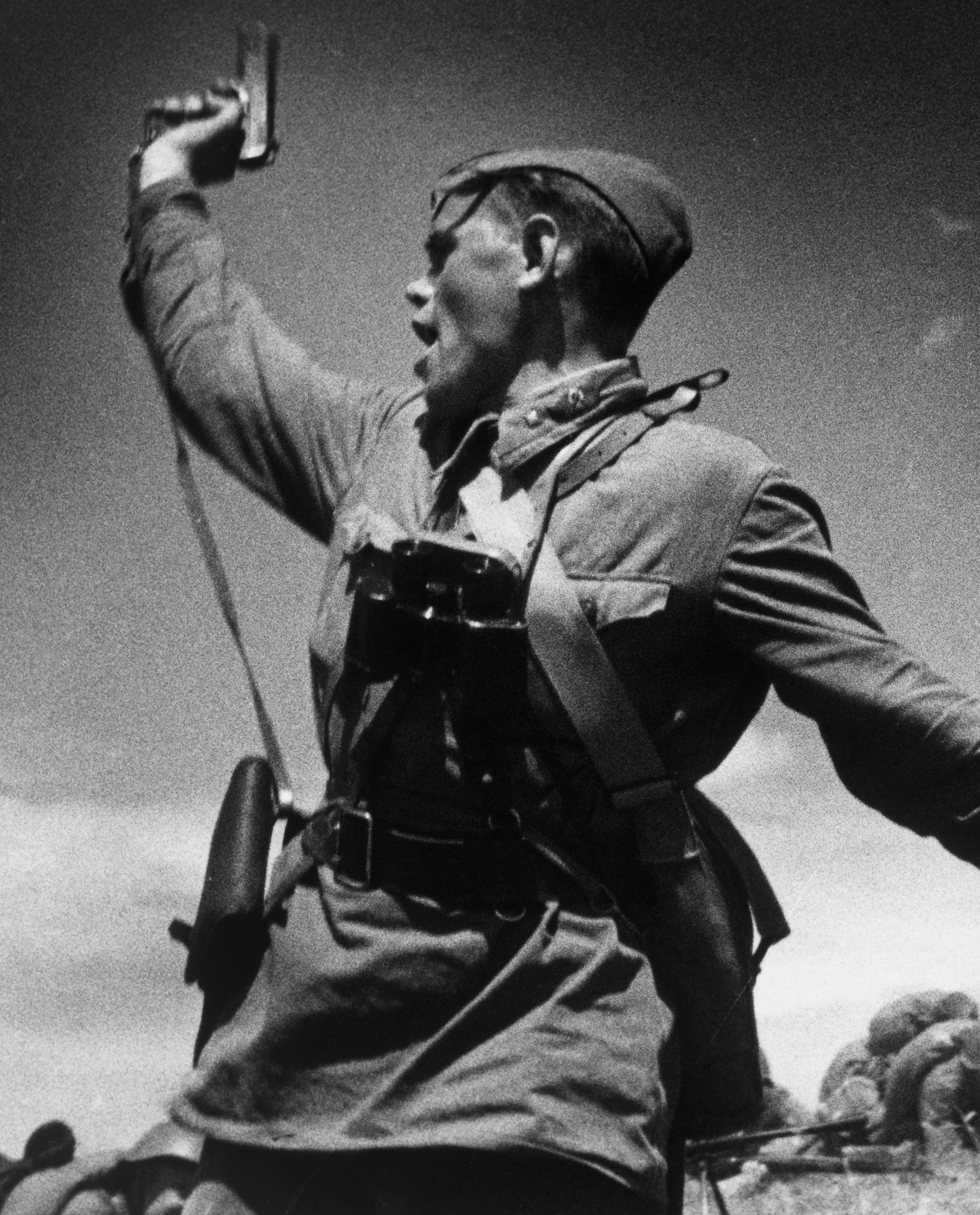
Kombat, a famous photograph of a Soviet junior political officer armed with a Tokarev TT-33 service pistol.

The TT-33 was primarily issued to officers, though some enlisted non-commissioned officers and specialists (such as snipers) were also issued with handguns as well. Cavalry units carried the Nagant 1895 revolver instead, since the lack of an external safety on the TT pistol presented a risk to both horse and rider.

While the TT-33 was used in small numbers during the Spanish Civil War, the first major use of the Tokarev pistol was during the Winter War against Finland. The Finns managed to capture a number of TT-33 pistols and PPD submachine guns, which they used until they ran out of 7.62 mm Tokarev ammunition.

During World War II, both the Germans and the Finns made use of captured TT-33 pistols, though the former had the advantage of making use of the 7.63×25mm Mauser cartridge, which can be loaded in TT pistols (though the 7.62×25mm Tokarev cannot be fired in weapons chambered for the 7.63 mm round due to the increased pressure of the Soviet cartridge). Captured pistols were re-issued to German troops as the Pistole 615(r).

After the war, the TT-33 was gradually replaced in Soviet military and police service by the Makarov pistol, though some pistols remained in use into the 21st century. China, North Korea, and Vietnam received substantial number of TT-33s and used them alongside Chinese-made copies during the Korean War and Vietnam War. Surplus Soviet pistols were also supplied in quantity to African countries as military aid. According to Thompson, over 60 countries used TT-33 pistols, with eight countries mass producing TT-33 copies or pistols based on the Tokarev design. Some insurgent groups in the Middle East also managed to obtain a large number of pistols, including some Hungarian-made Tokagypt 58s originally intended to arm the Nasser regime after the Eisenhower administration refused to sell arms to Egypt. Tokagypt 58s were a staple of the Red Army Faction arsenal, and founding members Ulrike Meinhof and Andreas Baader were taught how to shoot at an Arab training camp in Jordan with Tokagypts. Armed groups in Spain and Portugal such as the ETA and FP-25 also obtained a large number of Tokagypts.

During the Soviet–Afghan War, the Afghan mujahideen made use of pistols captured from the Soviets and Khyber Pass copies of the Tokarev and Makarov obtained from Pakistan as well.

== Conflicts ==
- Spanish Civil War
- World War II
- Korean War
- Vietnam War
- Arab–Israeli conflict
- Bangladesh Liberation War
- Hungarian Revolution of 1956
- Communist insurgency in Thailand
- Salvadoran Civil War
- Burundian Civil War
- War in Afghanistan (2001–2021)
- South African Border War
- First Chechen War
- Russo-Ukrainian War

== Users ==
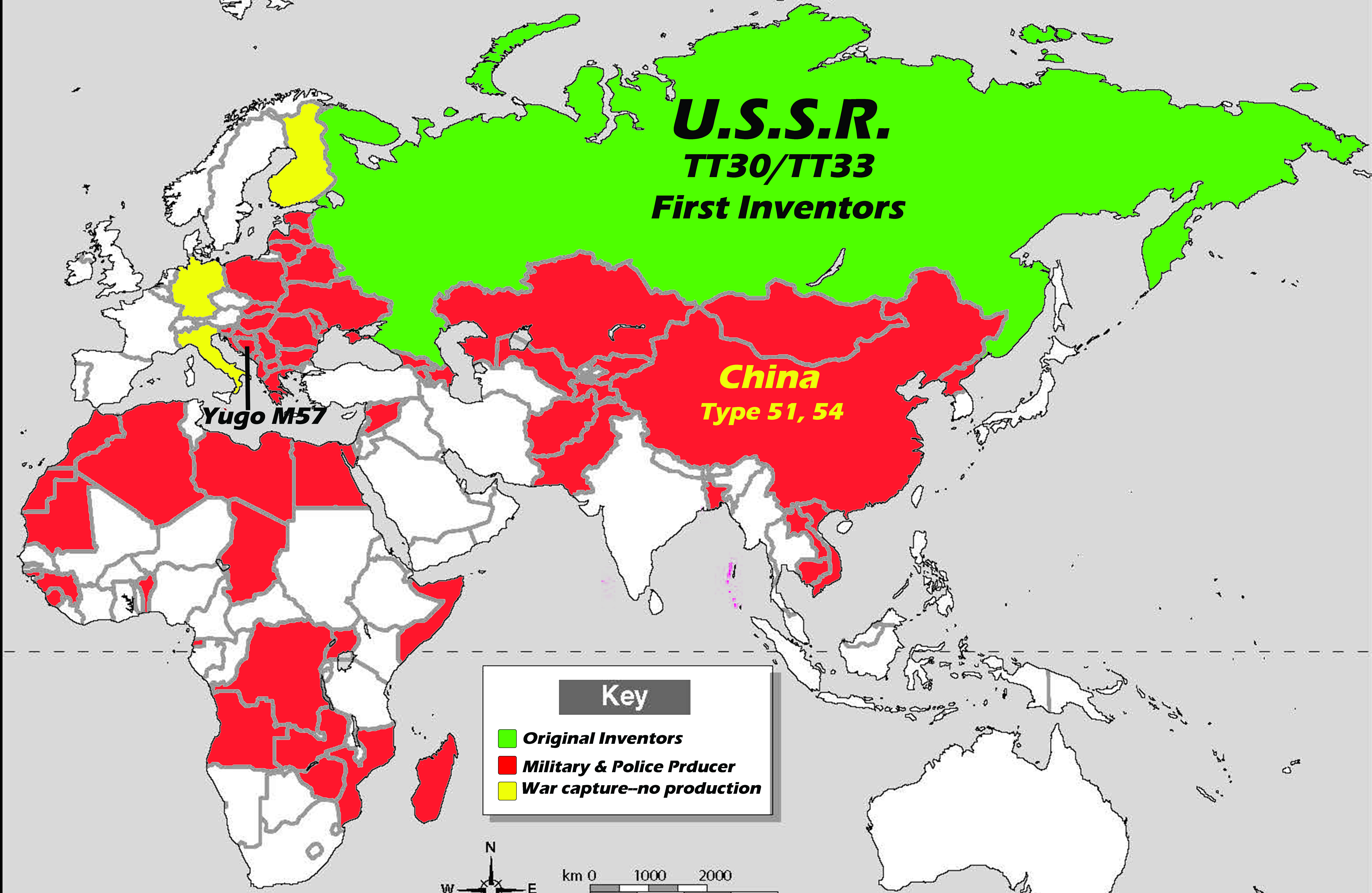
Map of TT operators during the Cold War

=== Current ===
- Afghanistan − Used by the Red Unit
- Albania
- Angola
- Armenia
- Azerbaijan
- Belarus − Used by Territorial Defense units
- Benin
- Cambodia
- Congo-Brazzaville
- Equatorial Guinea
- Georgia
- Guinea
- Guinea-Bissau
- Hungary − Produced locally as the M48
- Indonesia
- Iraq
- Ivory Coast
- Kazakhstan
- Kyrgyzstan
- Laos
- Libya
- Lithuania
- Madagascar
- Malta
- Mauritania
- Moldova
- Mongolia
- Montenegro − M57 and M70 pistols used
- Mozambique
- Pakistan − Khyber Pass copies produced
- Russia
- Sierra Leone
- Somalia
- Sri Lanka
- Syria
- Uganda
- Ukraine
- Vietnam − Chinese Type 54 and North Korean Type 68 pistols also used
- Zambia
- Zimbabwe

=== Former ===
- Bulgaria
- Finland − Limited use of captured TT-33 pistols during the Winter War and Continuation War. It was nicknamed the "Star Pistol" (tähti-pistooli) by Finnish soldiers
- East Germany − Limited use of TT-33 pistols until the Pistole M was adopted in 1958−1959
- Nazi Germany − Captured from the Soviet Union
- North Korea − Produced locally as the Type 66/68. Replaced by the Baek Du San pistol
- Latvia
- Poland − Produced locally as the wz. 1933. Replaced by the FB P-64 in 1967, remained in limited use until the 1990s
- Romania − Produced locally as the TTC (Tula Tokarev Cugir). Remained in use with military and police units until the late 1990s
- Soviet Union − TT-30 and TT-33

=== Non-state former ===
- Afghan mujahideen − Captured from Soviet troops. Khyber Pass copies were also obtained from Pakistan
- Chechen Republic of Ichkeria
- CNDD–FDD
- FNL-Icanzo
- FROLINA
- Kaze-FDD
- Palipe-Agakiza
- People's Liberation Army of Namibia
- People's Movement for the Liberation of Azawad
- Russian separatist forces in Ukraine
- Umkhonto we Sizwe
- Viet Cong − M20 used

== See also ==
- List of Russian weaponry
- Table of handgun and rifle cartridges
