= Danao, Cebu =

Component city in Cebu, Philippines

Danao
- Component city
- City of Danao
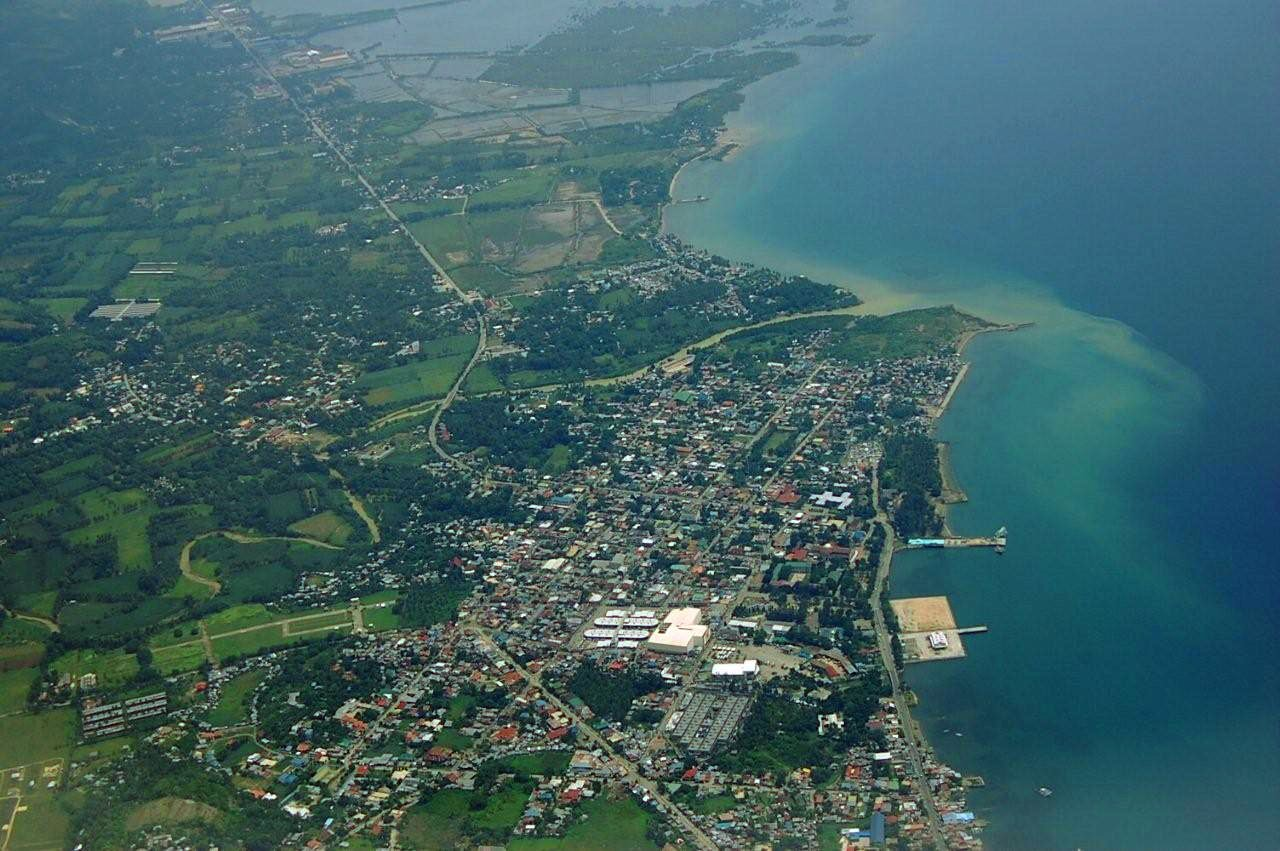
- Aerial view of Danao

- Seal
- Anthem: Danao among pinangga (Our beloved Danao)
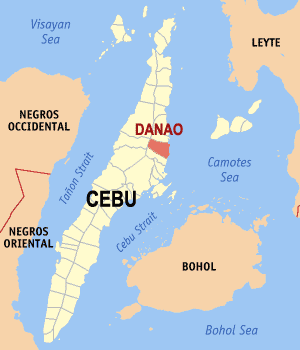
- Map of Cebu with Danao highlighted
- Interactive map of Danao
- Location within the Philippines
- Coordinates: 10°32′N 123°56′E
- Country: Philippines
- Region: Central Visayas
- Province: Cebu
- District: 5th district
- Chartered: 1773
- Cityhood: June 7, 1961
- Barangays: 42 (see Barangays)

Government
  - Type: Sangguniang Panlungsod
  - Mayor: Ramon D. Durano III (BAKUD)
  - Vice Mayor: Carmen Remedios H. Durano (BAKUD)
  - Representative: Vincent Franco D. Frasco (One Cebu)
  - City Council: Members: Ramon M. Durano V; Jerard G. Almendras; Jaime A. Duterte Jr.; Jose Calvin B. Tuadles; Roland M. Perez; Glee H. Delicano; Don Roel G. Arias; Jose Dax C. Banzon; Adano T. Roble; Jose Thaddeus Roble Jr.
  - Electorate: 99,396 voters (2025)

Area
  - Total: 107.30 km^{2} (41.43 sq mi)
- Elevation: 119 m (390 ft)
- Highest elevation: 867 m (2,844 ft)
- Lowest elevation: 0 m (0 ft)

Population (2024 census)
  - Total: 161,307
  - Density: 1,503.3/km^{2} (3,893.6/sq mi)
  - Households: 38,361

Economy
  - Income class: 2nd city income class
  - Poverty incidence: 21.34% (2023)
  - Revenue: ₱ 1,184 million (2024)
  - Assets: ₱ 2,424 million (2024)
  - Expenditure: ₱ 569.7 million (2024)
  - Liabilities: ₱ 654.9 million (2024)

Service provider
  - Electricity: Cebu 2 Electric Cooperative (CEBECO 2)
- Time zone: UTC+8 (PST)
- ZIP code: 6004
- PSGC: 072223000
- IDD : area code: +63 (0)32
- Native language: Cebuano
- Website: www.danaocity.gov.ph

Danao, officially the City of Danao (Cebuano: Dakbayan sa Danao; Filipino: Lungsod ng Danao), is a component city in the province of Cebu, Philippines. According to the 2024 census, it has a population of 161,307 people.

Danao is within the Metro Cebu area.

== Etymology ==
According to the most popular legend, the town derived its name from the word danawan, which means pond in English when Captain del Rosario established the town as a municipio.

== History ==
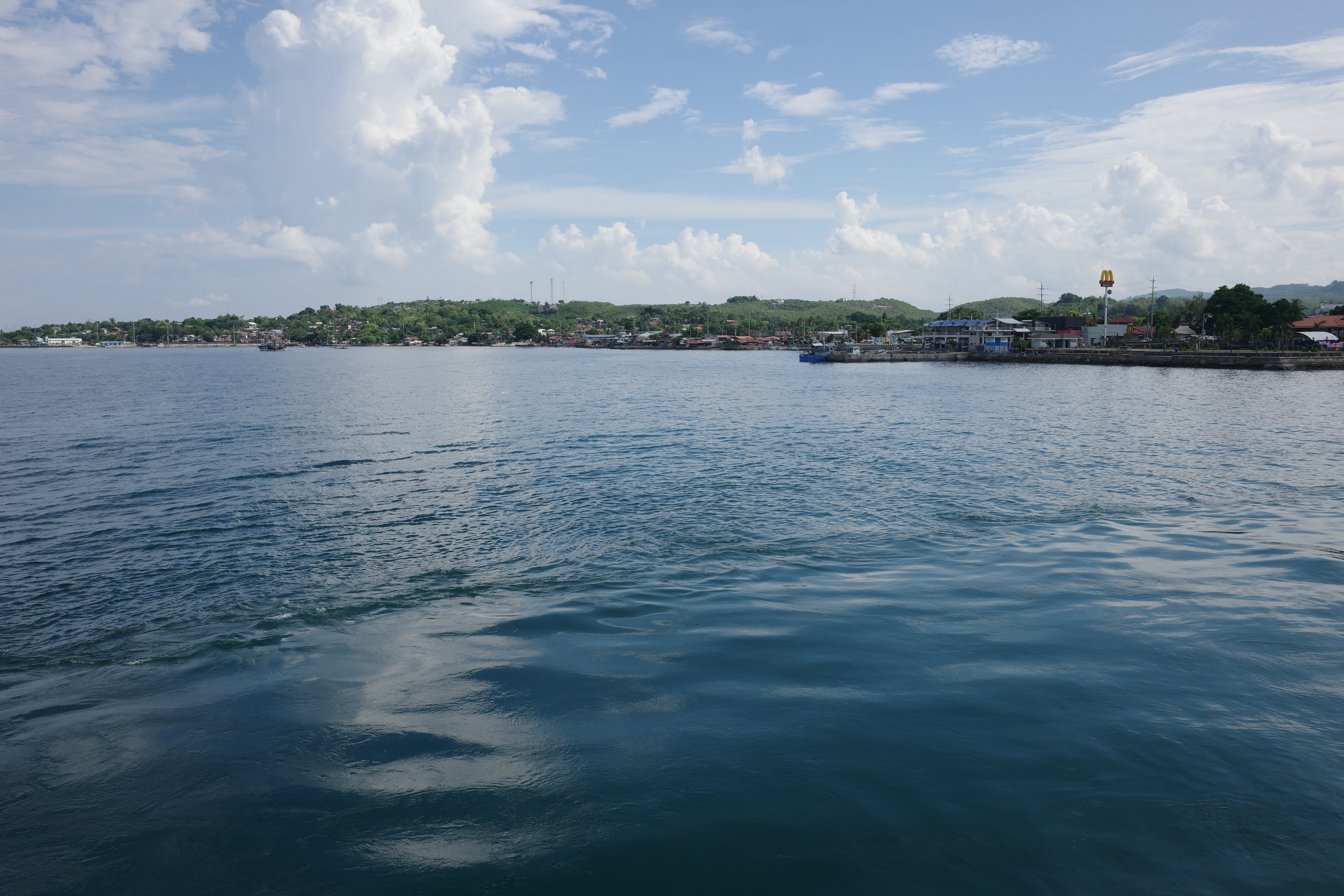
Danao City viewed from the Camotes Sea

The origin of the name Danao lacks concrete historical records, though two legendary accounts exist regarding its establishment as a municipio. The most popular legend dates back to 1844, involving a Spanish captain named Manuel Anecito del Rosario. Commissioned by early Spanish authorities in Cebu province, del Rosario's mission was to establish municipios from Compostela to Borbon.

While traveling north on horseback, Captain del Rosario encountered natives in Cotcot, tending to their carabaos in a pond. Unfamiliar with the area, he asked the locals (in Spanish) the name of the place. Misunderstanding his question, the natives thought he referred to the pond and replied danawan, meaning pond. Due to the captain's limited understanding of the local dialect and defective hearing, he interpreted the response as "Danao." Consequently, the place was named Danao, and Captain del Rosario established it as a municipio. The 1818 census showed that Danao had tributes representing 2,656 native families and 57 Spanish-Filipino families.

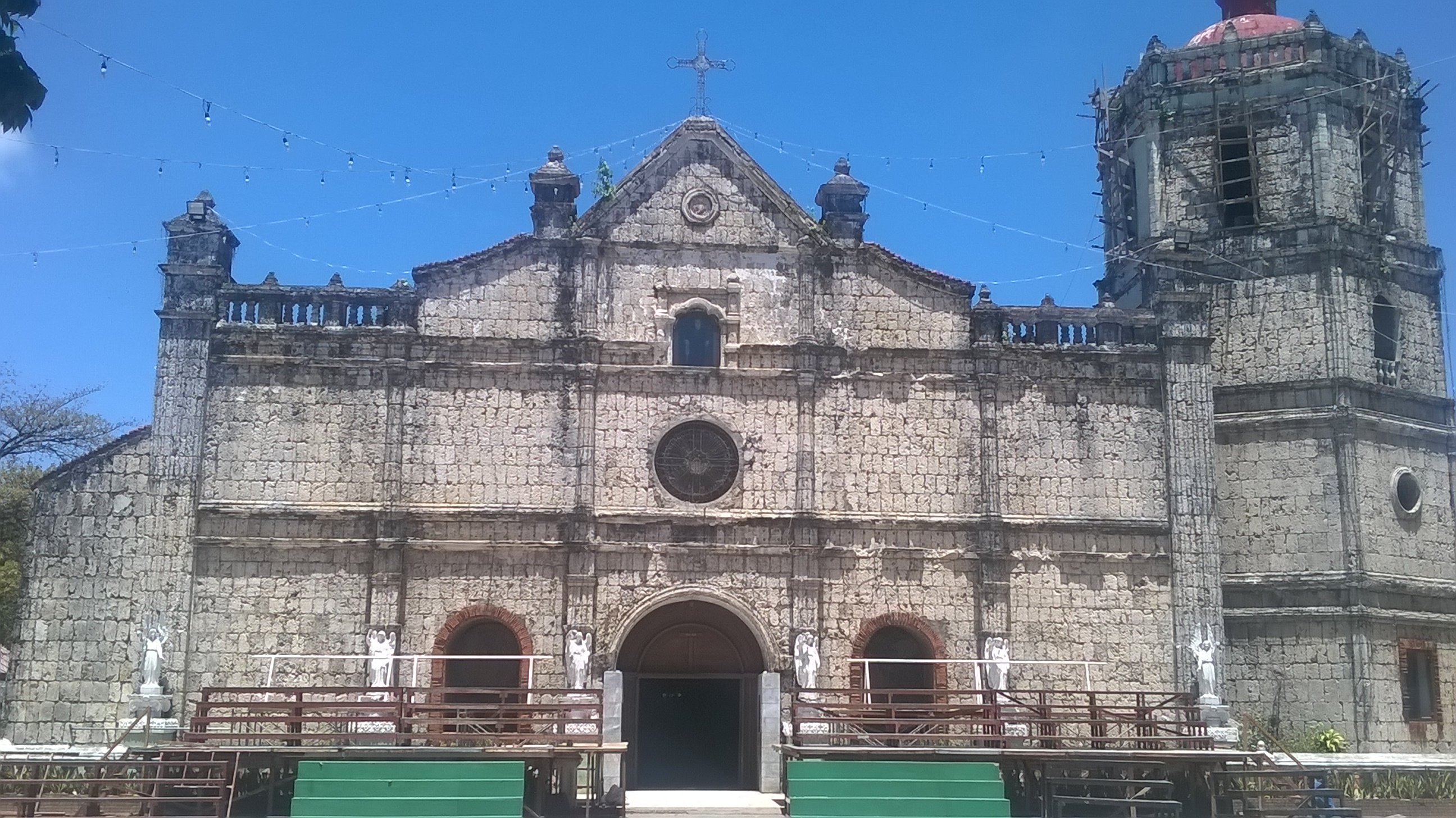
Santo Tomás de Villanueva Church

Captain del Rosario stayed in Danao for several years, overseeing the construction of essential infrastructure, including the presidencia (town hall), the Roman Catholic Church completed in 1847, the convento, and town streets such as Calle Lapulapu, Calle Rizal, and Calle Marcelo del Pilar. Some of the Spanish-era culverts in these streets still exist today.

Following the establishment of Danao, del Rosario continued to the north, helping to organize the towns of Carmen, Catmon, and Borbon. In 1860, he returned to Danao, adopting the surname Gonzales and settling permanently in the town he favored most.

Efforts to document Danao's pre-war and post-liberation history were unsuccessful, as many records were presumed lost or destroyed during World War II.

=== Establishment ===
Danao was officially established as a city on June 7, 1961, by virtue of Republic Act No. 3028. Each year, a Charter Day Celebration takes place from June 1–7, featuring various activities such as traditional games and customs enjoyed by Danawanons across generations.

=== Contemporary ===
In 2005, the definition of Metro Cebu was expanded, including Danao City as the northern boundary and Carcar as the southern boundary.

== Geography ==
Danao is in the Metro Cebu area and is 33 kilometres (21 mi) from Cebu City. It is bordered on the north by Carmen, on the west by Asturias, on the south by Compostela and to the east by the Camotes Sea.

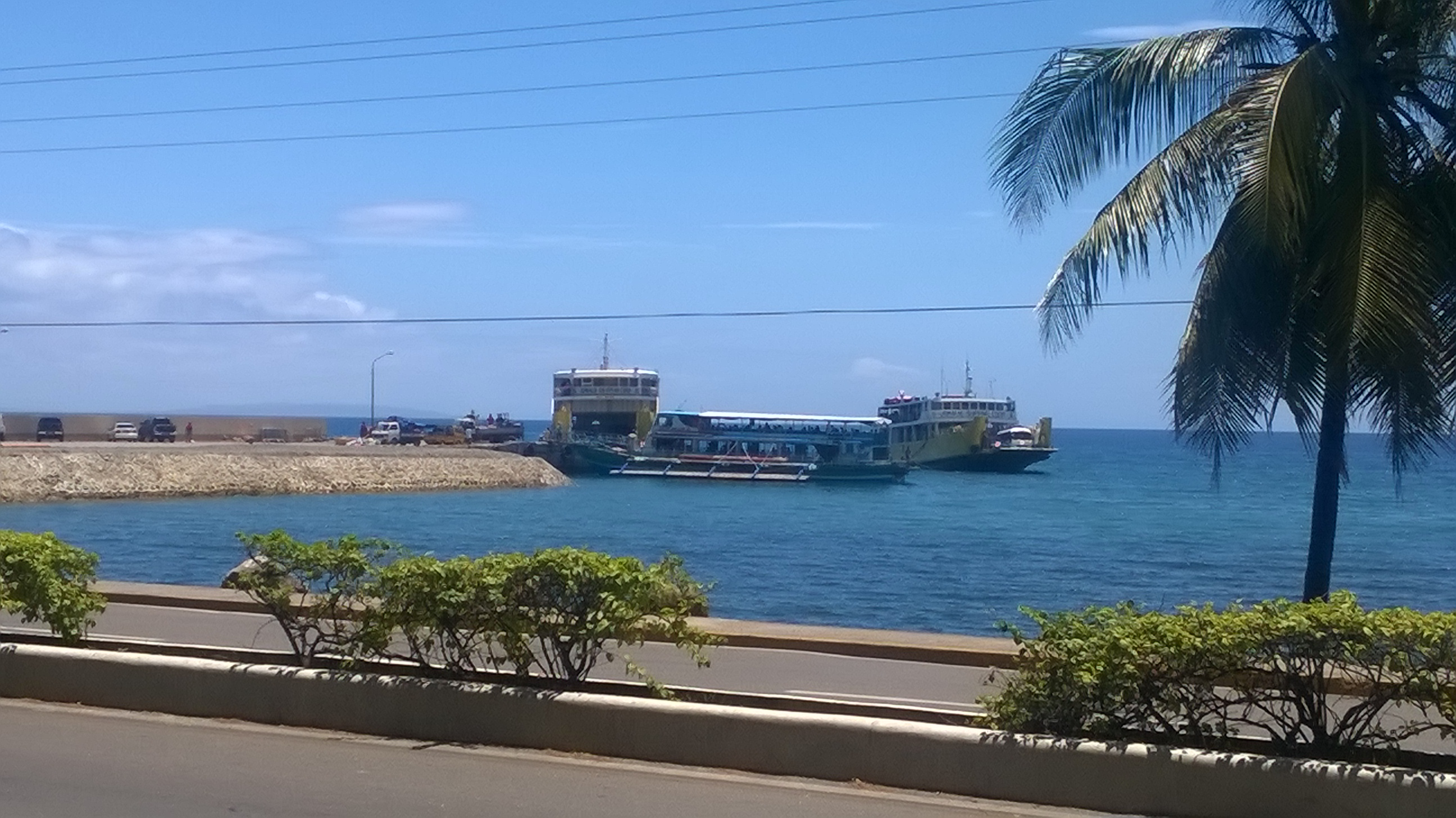
Port for ferries to the Camotes Islands and Leyte

=== Barangays ===
Danao is politically subdivided into 42 barangays. Each barangay consists of puroks and some have sitios.

PSGC	Barangay	Population			±% p.a.		Area		PD 2024	
		2024		2010			ha	acre	/km^{2}	/sq mi
072223001	Baliang	1.1%	1,843	1,728	▴	0.45%	527	1,302	350	910
072223002	Bayabas	0.4%	714	609	▴	1.11%	220	544	320	840
072223004	Binaliw	1.6%	2,635	2,341	▴	0.83%	121	299	2,200	5,600
072223006	Cabungahan	1.4%	2,317	2,201	▴	0.36%	130	321	1,800	4,600
072223007	Cagat-Lamac	0.8%	1,253	1,023	▴	1.42%	121	299	1,000	2,700
072223008	Cahumayan	2.6%	4,162	3,506	▴	1.20%	1,260	3,114	330	860
072223009	Cambanay	2.2%	3,526	2,818	▴	1.57%	336	830	1,000	2,700
072223010	Cambubho	0.6%	940	594	▴	3.24%	165	408	570	1,500
072223011	Cogon-Cruz	2.6%	4,188	3,034	▴	2.27%	281	694	1,500	3,900
072223012	Danasan	0.8%	1,350	1,266	▴	0.45%	516	1,275	260	680
072223013	Dungga	0.8%	1,273	1,017	▴	1.57%	256	633	500	1,300
072223014	Dunggoan	3.9%	6,310	5,313	▴	1.20%	241	596	2,600	6,800
072223015	Guinacot	3.0%	4,853	4,089	▴	1.20%	300	741	1,600	4,200
072223016	Guinsay	5.7%	9,152	7,887	▴	1.04%	376	929	2,400	6,300
072223017	Ibo	0.7%	1,171	964	▴	1.36%	194	479	600	1,600
072223018	Langosig	0.6%	1,020	750	▴	2.16%	126	311	810	2,100
072223019	Lawaan	1.0%	1,679	1,352	▴	1.52%	418	1,033	400	1,000
072223020	Licos	1.1%	1,852	1,581	▴	1.11%	251	620	740	1,900
072223021	Looc	5.9%	9,543	9,200	▴	0.25%	305	754	3,100	8,100
072223022	Magtagobtob	0.3%	453	382	▴	1.19%	324	801	140	360
072223023	Malapoc	0.8%	1,256	974	▴	1.78%	153	378	820	2,100
072223024	Manlayag	1.0%	1,638	1,578	▴	0.26%	426	1,053	380	1,000
072223025	Mantija	0.9%	1,447	1,233	▴	1.12%	337	833	430	1,100
072223026	Masaba	1.9%	3,090	2,743	▴	0.83%	223	551	1,400	3,600
072223027	Maslog	6.2%	9,929	9,892	▴	0.03%	323	798	3,100	8,000
072223028	Nangka	0.3%	413	446	▾	−0.53%	306	756	130	350
072223029	Oguis	0.4%	634	600	▴	0.38%	92	227	690	1,800
072223030	Pili	0.5%	777	677	▴	0.96%	184	455	420	1,100
072223031	Poblacion	5.6%	9,090	8,710	▴	0.30%	131	324	6,900	18,000
072223032	Quisol	0.9%	1,461	1,255	▴	1.06%	173	428	840	2,200
072223033	Sabang	7.7%	12,431	9,945	▴	1.56%	343	848	3,600	9,400
072223034	Sacsac	0.4%	618	514	▴	1.29%	184	455	340	870
072223035	Sandayong Norte	0.9%	1,490	1,454	▴	0.17%	71	175	2,100	5,400
072223036	Sandayong Sur	1.9%	3,069	2,808	▴	0.62%	404	998	760	2,000
072223037	Santa Rosa	1.0%	1,559	1,151	▴	2.13%	218	539	720	1,900
072223038	Santican	0.8%	1,218	1,014	▴	1.28%	290	717	420	1,100
072223039	Sibacan	0.4%	635	519	▴	1.41%	326	806	190	500
072223040	Suba	4.7%	7,523	6,785	▴	0.72%	40	99	19,000	49,000
072223041	Taboc	3.4%	5,482	4,880	▴	0.81%	126	311	4,400	11,000
072223042	Taytay	2.4%	3,914	3,618	▴	0.55%	31	77	13,000	33,000
072223043	Togonon	1.0%	1,619	1,394	▴	1.05%	1,100	2,718	150	380
072223044	Tuburan Sur	4.3%	6,944	5,407	▴	1.75%	229	566	3,000	7,900
	Total		161,307	119,252	▴	2.12%	10,730	26,514	1,500	14

=== Climate ===
Climate data for Danao, Cebu
Month	Jan	Feb	Mar	Apr	May	Jun	Jul	Aug	Sep	Oct	Nov	Dec	Year
Mean daily maximum °C (°F)	28 (82)	29 (84)	30 (86)	31 (88)	31 (88)	30 (86)	30 (86)	30 (86)	30 (86)	29 (84)	29 (84)	28 (82)	30 (85)
Mean daily minimum °C (°F)	23 (73)	23 (73)	23 (73)	24 (75)	25 (77)	25 (77)	25 (77)	25 (77)	25 (77)	25 (77)	24 (75)	23 (73)	24 (75)
Average precipitation mm (inches)	70 (2.8)	49 (1.9)	62 (2.4)	78 (3.1)	138 (5.4)	201 (7.9)	192 (7.6)	185 (7.3)	192 (7.6)	205 (8.1)	156 (6.1)	111 (4.4)	1,639 (64.6)
Average rainy days	13.4	10.6	13.1	14.5	24.2	27.9	28.4	27.7	27.1	27.4	22.5	15.9	252.7
Source: Meteoblue (modeled/calculated data, not measured locally)

== Demographics ==
Population census of Danao
Year	Pop.	±% p.a.
1903	16,173	—
1918	22,581	+2.25%
1939	28,387	+1.10%
1948	26,461	−0.78%
1970	47,662	+2.71%
1975	50,260	+1.07%
1980	56,967	+2.54%
1990	73,358	+2.56%
1995	79,932	+1.62%
2000	98,781	+4.64%
2007	109,354	+1.41%
2010	119,252	+3.20%
2015	136,471	+2.60%
2020	156,321	+2.90%
2024	161,307	+0.76%
Source: Philippine Statistics Authority

== Economy ==
Poverty incidence of Danao (%)

Source: Philippine Statistics Authority

=== Railways ===
The Cebu railway ran from Danao south to Argao. During World War II, the bridges, tracks and Central Station were bombed so extensively that the railway never recovered, and it closed in 1942. After that, whatever was left after the war was dug up to become the Cebu North Road.

Now a new light railway is to be built in Cebu.

=== Sugar ===
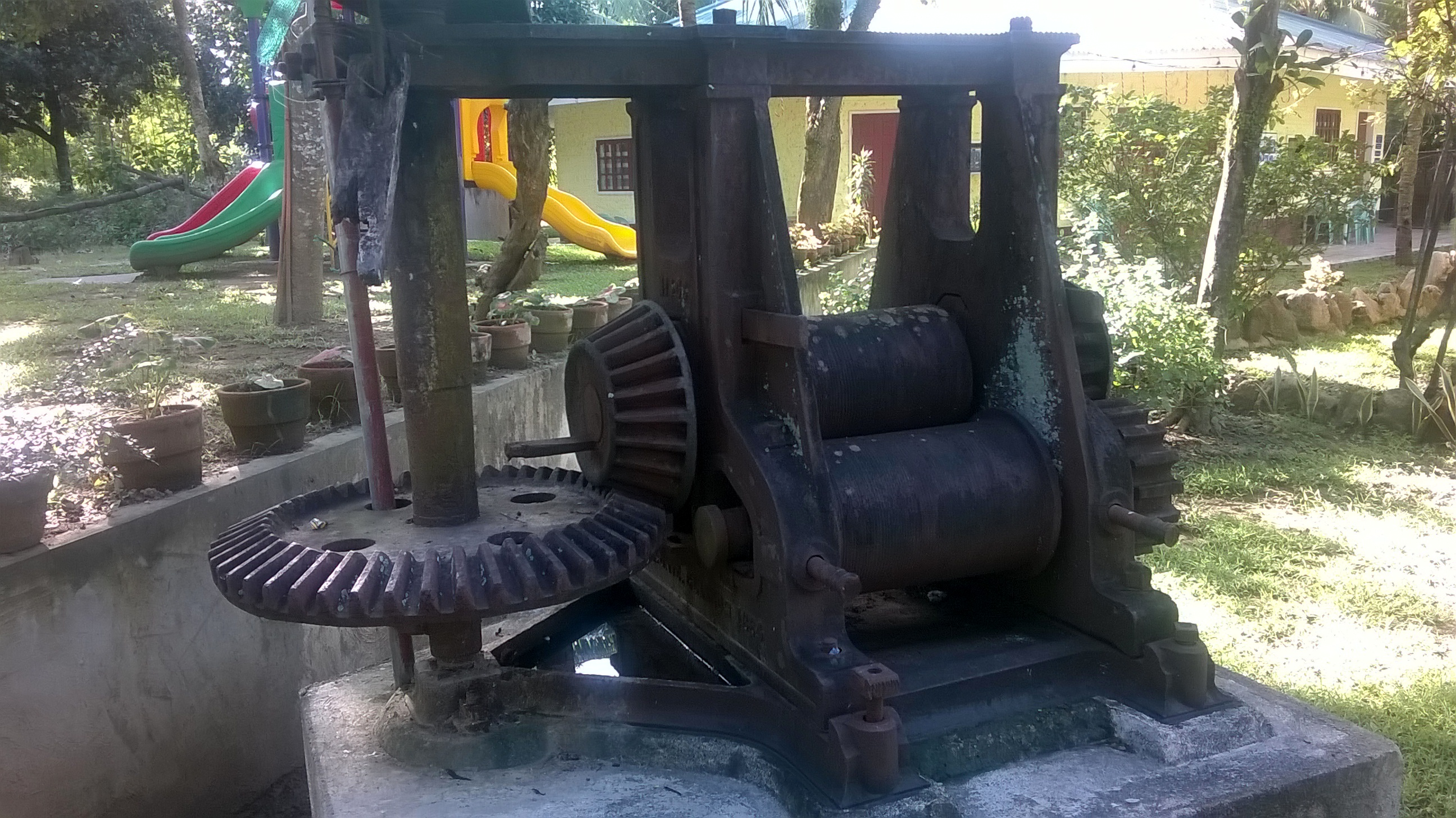
The industrial mill is now a decorated relic; the old sugar cane intosan is now a resort

The old system of milling sugar cane used to produce sugar, called "intosan". Although the railway was originally to move coal, it was soon used too to move sugar cane to the docks.

=== Gun industry ===
Danao was well known for its gun industry. The industry started around 1905–06. When World War II came, the Danao gunsmiths went underground, joined the guerrilla movement or were inducted into the United States Army Forces in the Far East. Their main task was to re-chamber the Japanese Arisaka rifles to fit the US .30 caliber round or to keep the original Japanese rifle in good service.

The industry went on, still underground. In the 1960s, the term paltik was given to the homemade (and illegal) guns. In the early 1990s the industry was legalized by the government, with the creation of two organizations of local gunsmiths. The organization now left with proper permit is Workers League of Danao Multi-purpose Cooperative (World MPC), in Dungguan, Danao.

World MPC was incorporated in October 1994 with twenty-five initial members. In November 1996 it was given license to manufacture handguns from caliber .22 to .45 by the Philippine National Police (PNP). The organization had been a potent group in working for the legalization of gun-making industry in the country with the aim to upgrade the technology and skills of gun makers, to provide job security and additional revenue for the government. The gun-making industry in Danao was pioneered using brass or copper as materials. The Chairman of World MPC was in charge of the compliance of the requirements of the Firearms Explosives Security Service Agency and Guards Supervisory Section (FESSAGES) until his death in 2010 after which World MPC itself was then shut down for non-compliance of FESSAGES policies.

=== Holiday industry ===
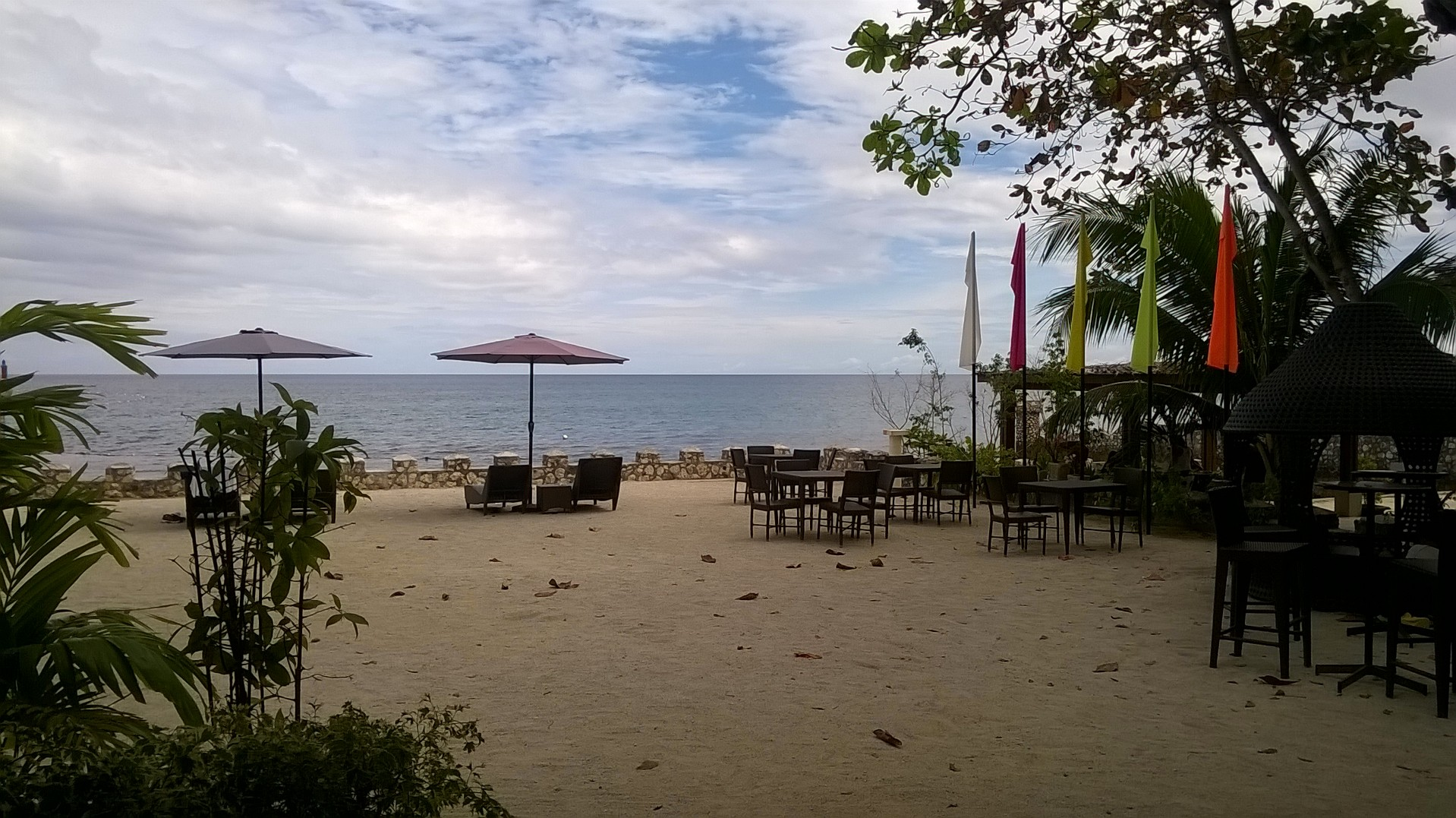
El Salvador resort in Sabang

Tourism in the area is still in its infancy. All along the eastern seaboard of Cebu there are family-owned resorts.

In 2017, Danao hosted the Xterra Off-road Triathlon. This was held at the Coco Palms resort.

=== Mitsumi ===
Mitsumi is one of the largest employers in northern Cebu. (Note: MinebeaMitsumi, Inc. (ミネベア株式会社 Minebea Kabushiki-gaisha) or NMB (Nippon Miniature Bearing) is a Japanese multinational corporation and a major producer of machinery components and electronics devices.) (Note: Mitsumi Electric Co, Ltd. - Cebu Mitsumi, Inc)

=== Metro Cebu Expressway ===
Work for the ₱50 billion, 74-kilometre (46 mi) Metro Cebu Expressway, started in 2018. It will connect Naga in the south to Danao in the north.

== Sources ==
- Rama, Karlon N. (Apr 24, 2007). "Boboy and Danao's thunder things". Archived from the original on Oct 14, 2008.
- Philippines News Agency, John Rey Saavedra (May 26, 2019). "Cebu LRT seen operational by 2022". Archived from the original on May 26, 2019.
- Philstar Global, Richmond Mercurio (Dec 10, 2018). "DOTr eyes operation of Cebu LRT, BRT by 2020". Archived from the original on Sep 20, 2019.
- Sun–Star, Oscar C. Pineda (Jan 20, 2004). "Danao's gunmakers seek government aid". Archived from the original on Feb 7, 2004.
- Sun–Star (Oct 8, 2005). "RDC enlarges Metro Cebu". Archived from the original on Sep 30, 2007.
- The Freeman, Erica Jean Palmera (May 15, 2014). "The old Cebu Railway". Archived from the original on May 19, 2014.
- The Freeman, Mitchelle L. Palaubsanon (May 4, 2017). "Construction of P50B road starts next year". Archived from the original on May 20, 2017.
