= Voevodin pistol =

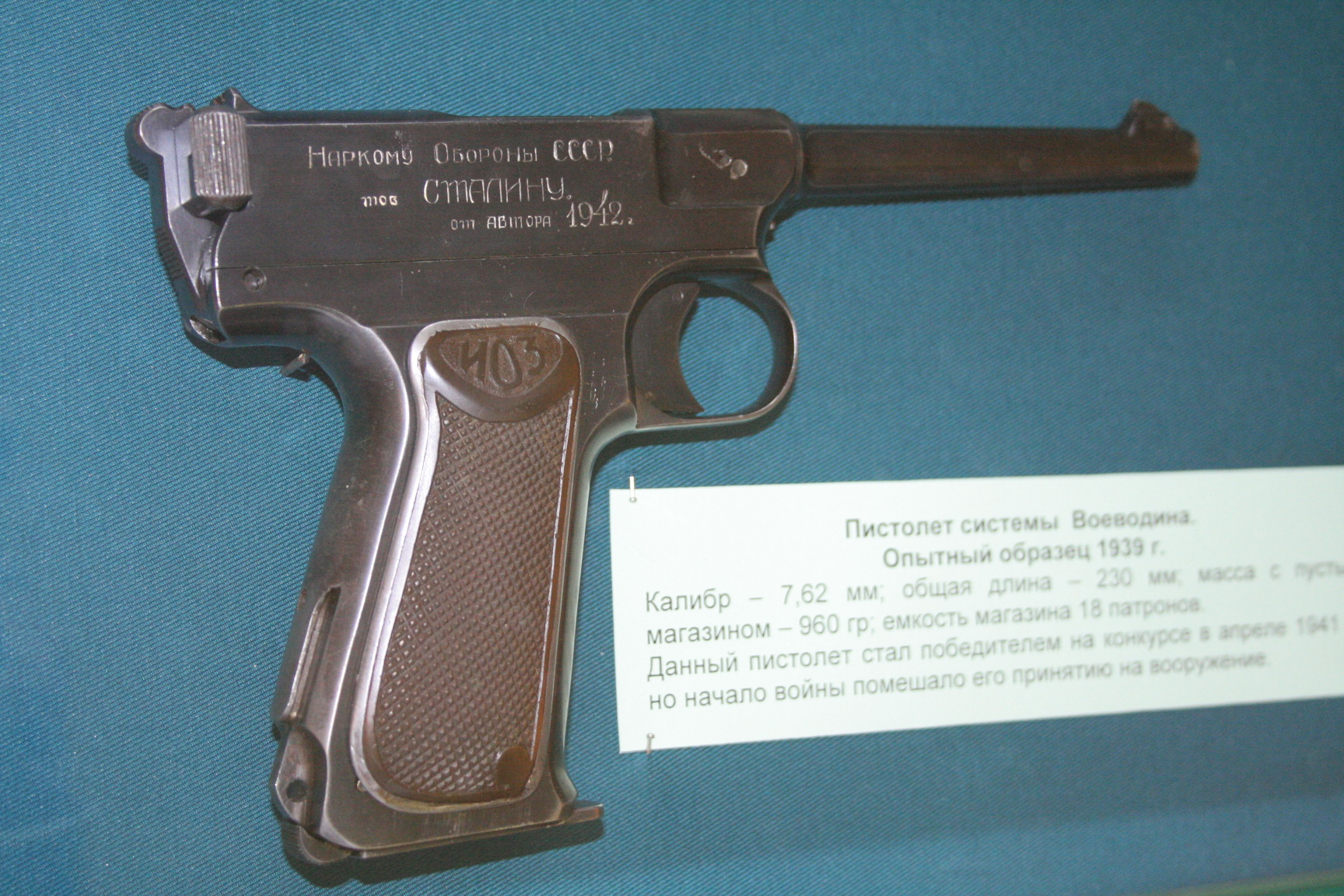
- The Voevodin pistol gifted to Joseph Stalin
- Type: Semi-automatic pistol
- Place of origin: Soviet Union

Service history
- In service: 1942
- Used by: Red Army
- Wars: World War II

Production history
- Designer: Pavel Voevodin
- Designed: 1939
- Manufacturer: NKV Factory No. 662
- Produced: 1942
- No. built: 500 - 1,500

Specifications
- Mass: 960 g (34 oz)
- Length: 230 mm (9.1 in)
- Cartridge: 7.62×25mm Tokarev
- Action: Short-stroke piston semi-automatic
- Effective firing range: 50 meters
- Feed system: Detachable box magazine: 9 rounds (First model, single-stack); 18 rounds (Second model, double-stack)

The Voevodin pistol (Russian: Пистолет системы Воеводина, romanized: Pistolet sistemy Voyevodina) is a Soviet semi-automatic pistol. It was developed by Soviet weapons designer Pavel Voevodin in 1939. The Voevodin pistol was unique at the time for its high magazine capacity, whilst mitigating issues of weight and bulkiness of contemporary large magazine pistols.

== History ==
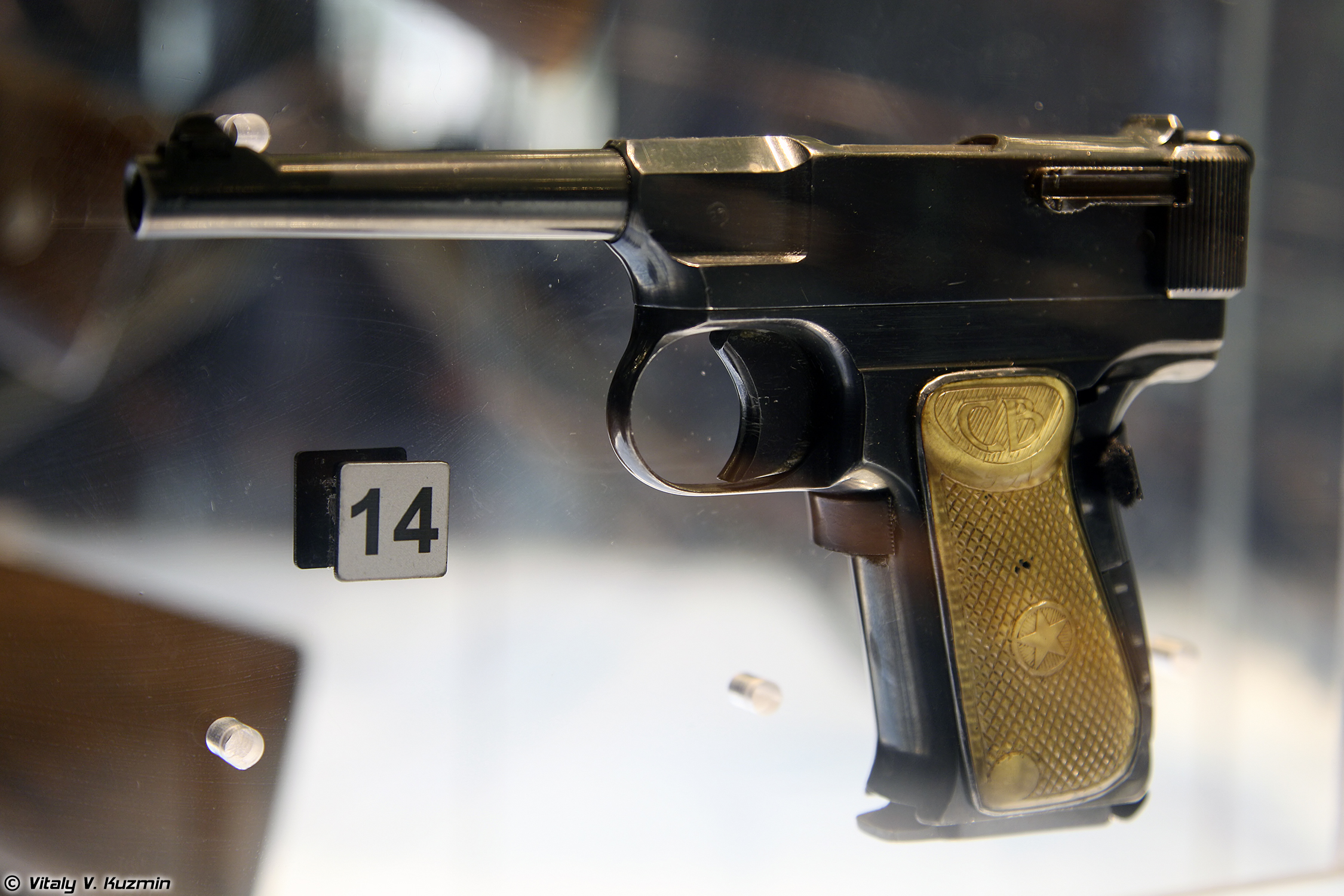
The 1939 prototype in the Tula State Arms Museum.

Prior to World War II, the Red Army held field tests of two variants of the single-stack 9-round Voevodin pistol for a competition to replace the TT-33 pistol in service in May 1939. One of the reasons cited for the change was the ability to fire the pistol through the hatch or fireports of a tank for defense. The Voevodin pistol was ranked second place by the commission in the first set of trials, and first in the second set of trials in July 1939. The pistol was recognized as meeting most of the conditions of the competition. Alongside the development of the 9-round variant was the double-stack 18-round capacity variant, which underwent trials in June 1940. The 18-round pistol failed the trials due to a large number of stoppages, but the commission expressed interest in the design and magazine capacity.

A final trial was conducted in March 1941 with improved versions of other pistols of the 1939 trials. The Voevodin pistol was accepted for service on 6 April 1941 by the Small Arms Directorate of the GAU primarily due to its magazine capacity and its affect on an increased fire rate, alongside higher accuracy and reliability compared to the other pistols of the final trial. The pistol was noted as being heavier than the TT-33. Shot grouping comparisons of the Voevodin pistol were able to match the effectiveness of groupings of the foreign Luger, Webley Self-Loading and Astra Model 900 pistols.

The adoption of the 18-round pistol was interrupted due to the invasion of the Soviet Union by the Germans in June 1941, as Soviet leadership found retooling to the new pistol to be impractical. In 1942, a batch of 500 to 1,500 Voevodin pistols were manufactured at NKV Factory No. 662 and sent to the front line for testing by the Red Army. Within this batch was an engraved Voevodin pistol gifted by Voevodin to Joseph Stalin. The engraved sample is currently housed in a museum in Russia. One of the original 1939 prototype pistols is featured in the Tula State Arms Museum.

In 1943, the GAU awarded Soviet military commanders with engraved versions of the Voevodin pistol. Of these, pistol number 524 was given to one of the then-leaders of the Soviet resistance during World War II, Panteleimon Ponomarenko. This pistol is stored in the Belarusian Great Patriotic War Museum.

== Design ==
In all versions of the pistol, the barrel bore is locked through the tilting of an insert. The rear of the insert rests against the receiver. Locking lugs on the insert's front end engage the locking lug of the slide when the insert moves upward. The recoil spring is housed in the slide.

For the May 1939 trials, two 9-round single-stack Voevodin pistols were developed - One version had a barrel shroud that functioned as a muzzle break with a fixed iron sight for 25 meters. Another version of the pistol lacked the shroud with graduated markings on its rear sight from 25 to 300 meters. The pistols were semi-automatic using a short-stroke piston and are hammer-fired. The Voevodin pistols have a similar trigger mechanism to the TT pistols. A trigger-bar disconnector switch is on the left side of the pistol frame that rises into a cutout on the receiver when the receiver is in its forward position. The disconnector switch disengages the trigger bar from the sear lever upon the recoil action of the receiver.

The 18-round variant had the addition of a guide-rod that interacted with the hammer and a double-stack magazine to allow a larger magazine capacity. The sear was developed with two arms, and the rod-type disconnector was moved to the right side of the pistol, preventing firing of the gun while the barrel is unlocked. The safety was changed into a flag that blocks the sear and receiver. Spent rounds are ejected via spring pressure from an ejector mounted to the locking insert. The receiver was given an independent mainspring, a magazine catch was added to the bottom of the pistol grip, and the rear sight was fixed to 50 meters.

== See also ==
- List of Russian weaponry
