= Alexander Voevodin =

Alexander F. Voevodin (Russian: Александр Феликсович Воеводин; born 13 May 1949) is a Russian-born biomedical scientist and educator. He is considered one of the leading early pioneers of HIV/AIDS research.

As Head of the AIDS Control Center of the Russian Federation in the early 1990s, Voevodin advocated for targeted voluntary testing among high risk groups, pushing back on the then-standard practice of mandatory testing. He is currently a private biomedical consultant (Vir&Gen, Toronto, Canada).

== Early life ==
Voevodin was born on May 13, 1949, in Kharkov in what was then the USSR. In his high school years he was successful in sport, but later, during his undergraduate studies, his focus changed from sports to science.

After graduating high school in 1966, Voevodin entered medical school (currently the Dnipro State Medical University, Ukraine). In 1972 he graduated as M.D. and was recruited by the USSR Academy of Medical Sciences. He did his postgraduate studies in the research institutes of the academy in Moscow and Sukhumi. In 1977, Voevodin defended his Ph.D. thesis "Antigenic characterization of primate oncogenic viruses" at the Ivanovsky Virology Institute, Moscow. His mentor was Prof. Boris Lapin (Russian: Борис Аркадьевич Лапин).

== Academic career ==
In the late 1970s-80s, Voevodin worked at the Institute of Experimental Pathology and Therapy of the USSR Academy of Medical Sciences, Sukhumi. His research focused on the oncogenic viruses, mostly of non-human primates. In 1984 he defended his D.Sc. dissertation "Immunology of Primate Oncogenic Viruses" at the Herzen Oncology Institute, Moscow. While being Head of AIDS Control Center of Russian Federation in the early 1990s he advocated targeted voluntary testing of high risk groups as opposed to universal mandatory screening.

After collapse of the USSR, Voevodin worked at the Karolinska Hospital/Institute, Sweden. In 1993 he joined the Department of Microbiology, Faculty of Medicine. Working there he published a number of papers in research journals, most notably on the identification of the Middle Eastern lineage of human retrovirus HTLV-1, genetic resistance to HIV/AIDS and interspecies transmission of retroviruses in non-human primates. The latter contributed to establishing the origin of HIV-1.

In 1999 the Royal College of Pathologists, London, UK awarded Voevodin a title of Fellow (FRCPath) by virtue of his published research. In 2004 A. Voevodin moved to Canada where, together with Prof. Preston Marx of Tulane University, New Orleans, USA, wrote "Simian Virology", an encyclopedia of monkey and ape viruses and non-human primate models of human viral diseases.

== Honours and awards ==
- All-USSR Prize for Young Scientists in Medicine (1980)
- USSR Academy of Medical Sciences the Best Research in Infectious Immunology – Timakov Prize (1983)
