= Paltik =

Filipino term for a homemade firearm

Paltik is a Filipino term for a homemade firearm. It is usually manufactured using scrap metal and angle iron. These homemade weapons are usually manufactured in Danao, Cebu, where the production of replicas of known firearms is a cottage industry. The manufacturers claim to be able to replicate any gun, although they prefer to mass-produce six-cylinder .38 caliber revolvers. The Philippine government notes that these firearms are of low quality, even if some are considered as "Class A" or high quality. Danao has the most concentration of factories since the 1940s, but paltik production can also be found in Negros, Leyte, and Mindanao. The Moro Islamic Liberation Front were also known to produce paltik but were unable to upscale their production due to government pressure.

The paltik suffered from poor accuracy and low quality firing mechanisms. Some lacked rifled bores, reducing their accuracy. Due to poor craftsmanship, the weapon was more dangerous to the shooter than the target. Some Filipino gunsmiths however, did make reliable percussion cap rifles that functioned in a manner similar to a 19th-century musket.

Paltiks are still being illegally manufactured in the Philippines today. These were being registered during the administration of President Corazon Aquino, but this "legalization" was revoked and all registered paltiks had to be surrendered to the government. President Gloria Macapagal Arroyo signed Executive Order No. 171 in 2003 which prohibits paltiks from being licensed.

High quality replicas of .45 caliber semi-auto M1911 pistols have been recorded being made in the Philippines and ending up in the United States black market.

== See also ==
- Gun industry in Danao
- Improvised firearm
- Khyber Pass copy
- Privately made firearm
