= Miss Universe Philippines Cebu 2025 =

2nd Miss Universe Philippines Cebu pageant

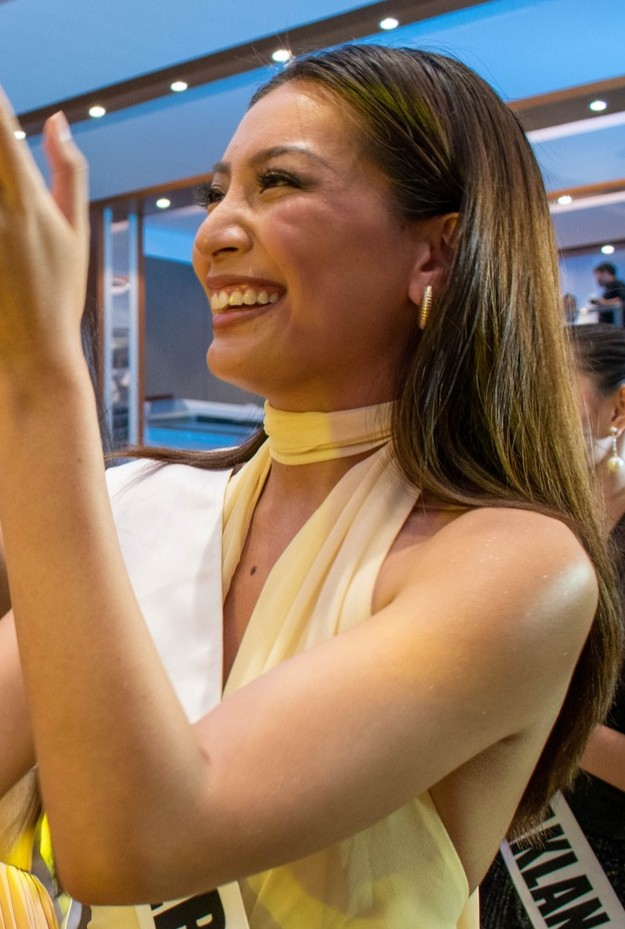
- Gabriella Mai Carballo
- Date: December 18, 2024
- Presenters: Rabiya Mateo; Steffi Rose Aberasturi
- Entertainment: Andre Cue
- Theme: Confidently Beautiful Cebuanas
- Venue: Waterfront Cebu City Hotel & Casino, Cebu City, Philippines
- Entrants: 17
- Placements: 10
- Debuts: Borbon; Consolacion; Moalboal; Ronda; Samboan
- Withdrawals: Alegria; Argao; Bantayan Island; Carcar; Compostela; Medellin
- Winner: Gabriella Mai Carballo; Cebu City North
- Congeniality: Aj Queniahan; Santa Fe
- Photogenic: Gabriella Mai Carballo; Cebu City North

Miss Universe Philippines Cebu 2025 was the second Miss Universe Philippines Cebu pageant under the Accredited Partners program, held at the Waterfront Hotel & Casino in Cebu City, Philippines, on 18 December 2024.

At the end of the event, Kris Tiffany Janson of Cebu City North crowned Gabriella Mai Carballo of Cebu City North as the Miss Universe Philippines Cebu 2025. Carballo will represent Cebu in the Miss Universe Philippines 2025.

Chella Grace Falconer of Naga City was also crowned as Miss Universe Philippines Cebu Tourism.

== Background ==
=== Selection of participants ===
On 23 September 2024, the organization launched its search for the next Cebuanas who would represent the Cebu at the Miss Universe Philippines 2025 competition. It was held at the Bai Hotel Cebu. On 9 November 2024, the seventeen contestants were presented during the Sashing Ceremony and Media Presentation at the Mountain Wing, SM Seaside City Cebu.

=== Location and date ===
On 4 October 2024, the organization announced that the coronation will be held on 18 December 2024, at the Pacific Grand Ballroom, Waterfront Hotel Cebu City and Casino.

== Results ==
=== Placements ===
Placement	Contestant
Miss Universe Philippines Cebu 2025	Cebu City North – Gabriella Mai Carballo
Miss Universe Philippines Cebu 2025 Tourism	Naga – Chella Grace Falconer
1st Runner-Up	Santa Fe – Aj Queniahan
2nd Runner-Up	Moalboal – Jennifer Kim Emmerich
3rd Runner-Up	Lapu-Lapu – Jamie Javier
Top 10	Consolacion – Sarah Hudson; Danao – Stefanie Alcarez; Sogod – Ahfinnie Tenebroso; Tabuelan – Maria Glen Diamante; Tuburan – Chain Lee Templo

==== Special awards ====
Award		Contestant
Best in Evening Gown		Cebu City North - Gabriella Mai Carballo
Best in Swimsuit	Winner; 1st Runner-up; 2nd Runner-up	Cebu City North - Gabriella Mai Carballo; Naga City - Chella Grace Falconer; Tabuelan - Maria Glen Diamante
Miss Photogenic		Cebu City North - Gabriella Mai Carballo
Miss Congeniality		Santa Fe - Aj Queniahan
Best in Funwear	Winner; 1st Runner-up; 2nd Runner-up	Lapu-Lapu City - Jamie Javier; Cebu City North - Gabriella Mai Carballo; Naga City - Chella Grace Falconer
Best Designer for Funwear		Tabuelan - Maria Glen Diamante
Best Gown Designer		Ronda - Cris Cadungog
Best in Swimwear by Skin 911		Santa Fe - Aj Queniahan
Best in Production Number		Lapu-Lapu City - Jamie Javier

==== Corporate awards ====
Award	Contestant
Miss Conzace	Lapu-Lapu City - Jamie Javier
Miss Confident Award	Cebu City North - Gabriella Mai Carballo
Miss Mestiza	Naga City - Chella Grace Falconer
Miss Celebrity Optical	Lapu-Lapu City - Jamie Javier
Miss PH Care	Moalboal - Jennifer Kim Emmerich
Miss Anytime Fitness	Consolacion - Sarah Hudson
Seahorse Yacht Ambassadress	Santa Fe - Aj Queniahan
Waterfront Cebu City Hotel & Casino Ambassadress	Cebu City North - Gabriella Mai Carballo
Face of Kazuwa Prome	Lapu-Lapu City - Jamie Javier
The Face of Mags	Cebu City North - Gabriella Mai Carballo
Miss Rose Pharmacy	Cebu City North - Gabriella Mai Carballo
Miss Myra-E	Cebu City North - Gabriella Mai Carballo
Miss Votelabs	Tuburan - Chain Lee Templo
La Panetteria Di Luigi Ambassadress	Ronda - Katja Bacoy
Miss Skin 911 Premier	Cebu City North - Gabriella Mai Carballo
Miss Skin 911 Medical	Naga City - Chella Grace Falconer
Immo-Plan GMBH Ambassadress	Cebu City North - Gabriella Mai Carballo

== Pageant ==
=== Preliminary competition ===
The preliminary competition and gala night was held at the Radisson Blu Hotel on 12 December 2024.

=== Final program ===
The coronation night was held at the Waterfront Cebu City Hotel and Casino on 18 December 2024. It was hosted by Miss Universe Philippines 2020, Rabiya Mateo and Binibining Cebu 2018 and Miss Universe Philippines 2021 Second Runner-up, Steffi Rose Abersturi. Andre Cue performed as guest artist.

==== Judges ====
- Mags Cue - VP for Global and National Search, Miss Universe Philippines
- Arnold Mercado - Director, MUPH Local Directorship Program
- Atty. Kristine Joyce Batucan - City Administrator, Cebu City Government
- Liz Tagimacruz - Reigning Classic Mrs. International Global 2024
- Eleanor Velasco - Owner and CEO, Skin 911 and Skin 911 Medical
- Wendy Wilson - COO, Immokalee Realty Corporation
- Pearl Lapena - Owner and Visionary, Sewlocal.ph
- Ali Banting - General Manager, Waterfront Cebu City Hotel and Casino
- Aljon Azote - Local Trade Manager, Conzace
- Celso Ilao - Senior Account Manager, Unilab Skin Sciences

== Contestants ==
Seventeen delegates competed for the title.

City/Municipality	Contestant
Aloguinsan	Riza Mae La Paz
Borbon	Jannah Salazar
Cebu City North	Gabriella Mai Carballo
Cebu City South	Christine Mae Saladaga
Consolacion	Sarah Hudson
Daanbantayan	Lycamae Saplad
Danao	Stefanie Alcarez
Dumanjug	Ethel Joy Batoon
Lapu-Lapu	Jamie Javier
Medellin	Sunshine Iriarte
Moalboal	Jennifer Kim Emmerich
Naga	Chella Grace Falconer
Ronda	Katja Bacoy
Samboan	Bea Abugay
Sogod	Ahfinnie Tenebroso
Santa Fe	Aj Queniahan
Tabuelan	Shindell Atibula
Tuburan	Chain Lee Templo
