= Miss Universe Philippines Cebu =

Regional pageant title

- Type: Women's beauty pageant
- Province represented: Cebu
- Qualifies for: Miss Universe Philippines
- First edition: 2020
- Most recent edition: 2024

Miss Universe Philippines Cebu is a regional title under Miss Universe Philippines (MUPH), representing Cebu in the annual national pageant. The titleholder serves as Cebu's ambassador, showcasing its culture, heritage, and tourism. Titleholders often promote Cebuano culture, sustainable tourism, community development, and environmental preservation, protecting Cebu's historical landmarks.

== History ==
The title was officially integrated into the Miss Universe Philippines Accredited Partners Program following its separation in 2019 from Binibining Pilipinas, which is the oldest active national beauty pageant in the Philippines. Alternative names for Cebu are Cebu City, Lapu-Lapu City, Mandaue City, and Cebu Province.

=== Notable winners ===
Cebu's representatives have achieved the following success in the Miss Universe Philippines competition:

- Beatrice Luigi Gomez (Miss Universe Philippines 2021) – The first openly LGBTQ+ winner of MUPH, representing Cebu City. She later advanced to the Miss Universe 2021 pageant in Eilat, Israel, where she was placed in the Top 5.
- Gazini Ganados (Miss Universe Philippines 2019) – Representing Talisay, Cebu, Ganados won the Best in National Costume award and was placed in the Top 20 at Miss Universe 2019.

== Selection process ==
The titleholder is chosen through local pageants or appointed by provincial organizers. The participants undergo strict preparation in public speaking, runway skills, and community engagement. The pageant features various segments, including evening gown, swimsuit, and question-and-answer portions. Contestants are judged based on beauty, intelligence, and advocacy. Local mentors and MUPH officials prepare the winners for the national competition.

== Titleholders ==
Year	Represented	Miss Universe Philippines Cebu	Hometown	Age	Awards	Ref.
2024	Cebu City - North	Kris Tiffany Janson	Cebu City	34	Best in Evening Gown; Miss Oro Galleria; Miss Myra Standout Beauty; Miss Esteem Medica	
2025	Cebu City - North	Gabriella Mai Carballo	Cebu City	26	Best in Evening Gown; Best in Swimsuit; Miss Photogenic; Best in Funwear 1st Runner-up; Miss Confident Award; Waterfront Cebu City Hotel & Casino Ambassadress; The Face of Mags; Miss Rose Pharmacy; Miss Myra-E; Miss Skin 911 Premier; Immo-Plan GMBH Ambassadress	
2026	No Pageant Held					

=== Winners Gallery ===
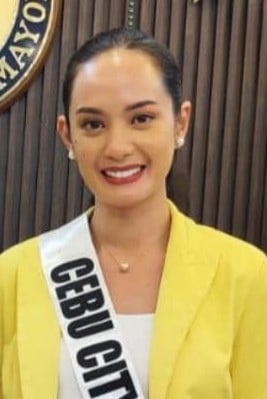
Miss Universe Philippines Cebu 2024 Kris Tiffany Janson Cebu City - North

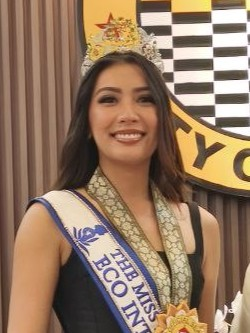
Miss Universe Philippines Cebu 2025 Gabbi Carballo Cebu City - North

== Cebu at Miss Universe Philippines ==
Year	Represented	Candidate	Age (Note: Ages at the time of Miss Universe)	Placement	Awards	Ref.
2020	Cebu	Apriel Smith	24	Top 16		
2020	Cebu City	Tracy Maureen Perez	27	Top 16	Miss Photogenic; Best in Swimsuit Photo	
2020	Mandaue	Lou Dominique Piczon	24	Top 16		
2021	Cebu	Steffi Rose Aberasturi	27	2nd Runner-Up	Miss Luxxe White Reveal Instabright Stunner	
2021	Cebu City	Beatrice Luigi Gomez	26	Miss Universe Philippines 2021	Best in Swimsuit; Best in Evening Gown; Miss Luxxe Immune Plus Game Changer; Miss Cream Silk	
2022	Cebu	Lou Dominique Piczon	26	Top 10	Miss Okada Manila	
2022	Cebu City	Chantal Elise Schmidt	20	Top 10	Miss Cavaso	
2022	Lapu-Lapu	Sashi Chiesa	26	Unplaced		
2022	Mandaue	Isabel Luche	22	Unplaced	Miss Jewelmer	
2023	Cebu	Emmanuelle Camcam	28	Top 18		
2023	Cebu City	Dianne Padillo	27	Unplaced		
2023	Lapu-Lapu	Clare Inso	24	Unplaced		
2023	Mandaue	Breanna Marie Evans	27	Withdrew		
2024	Cebu	Kris Tiffany Janson	34	Top 10	Icon Doll	
2024	Mandaue	Victoria Leslie Ingram	27	Unplaced		
2024	Bantayan Island	Juvel Ducay	29	Unplaced		
2024	Talisay	Mary Josephine Paaske	21	Unplaced		
2024	Toledo	Kim Irish Placibe	19	Unplaced		
2025	Cebu	Chella Falconer	25	Withdrew		
2025	Cebu City	Gabriella Mai Carballo	26	The Miss Philippines Eco International 2026		
2025	Lapu-Lapu	Natasha Shay Testa	20	Unplaced		
2025	Mandaue	Stefanie Przewodnik	19	Withdrew		
2025	San Fernando	Thelma Suzanne Dayao	19	Unplaced		
2026	Cebu	Nicole Borromeo	25	The Miss Philippines Worldwide 2026	Faces of Mags; Miss Abu; Miss Ever Bilena; Miss Great Lengths IColor; Miss Zleep by Zion; Miss Jell Life Beauties; Ambassadress of Goodwill (Misamis Occidental award)	
2026	Cebu City	Apriel Smith	29	The Miss Philippines Charm 2026	Queens of Pablo	

== See also ==
- Miss Universe Philippines Pampanga
