= N840 highway =

Road in the Philippines

Route 840

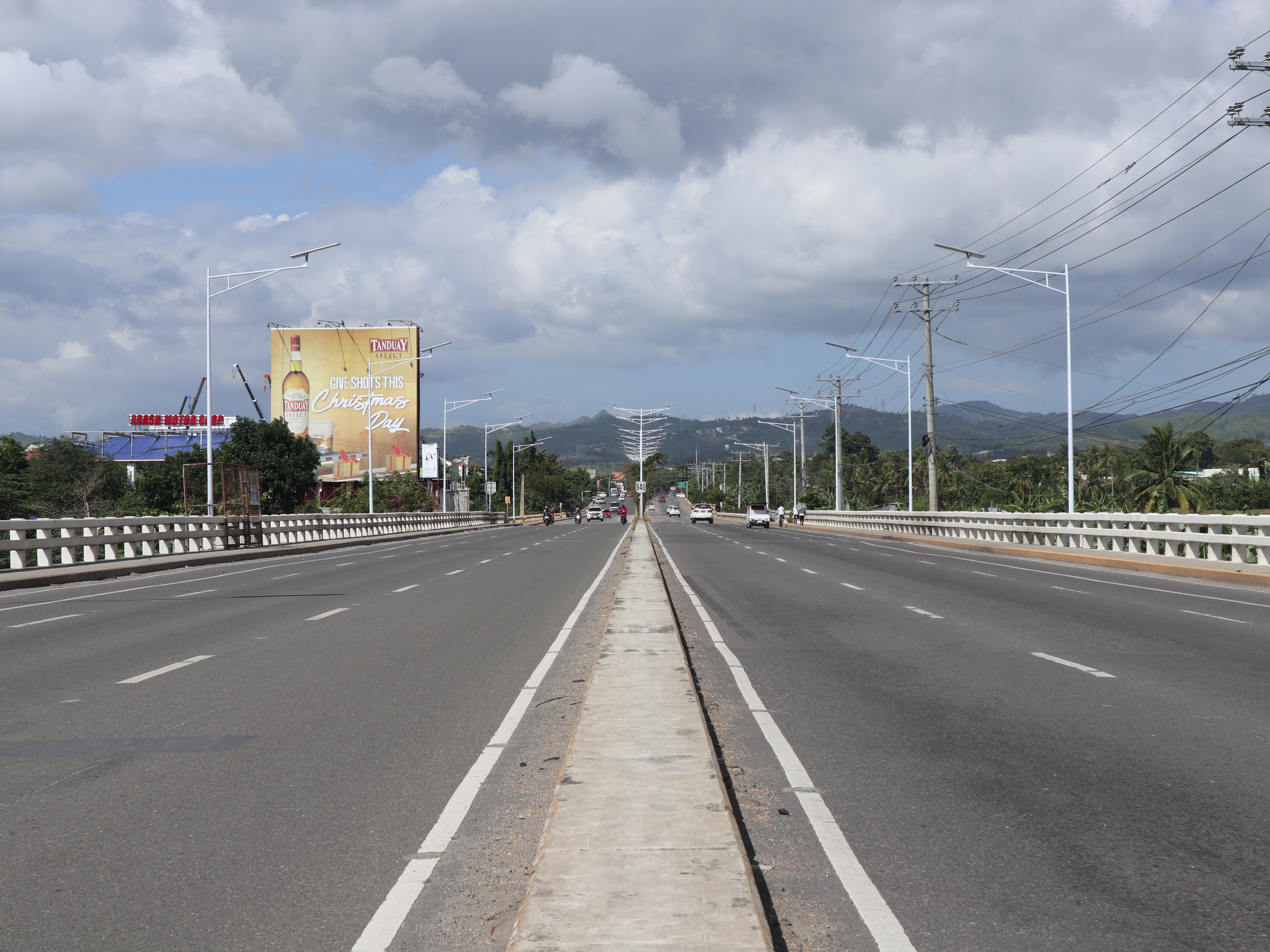
- Cebu South Coastal Road being carried by Mananga Bridge III

Route information
- Maintained by the Department of Public Works and Highways (DPWH)

Major junctions
- Northeast end: N8 (Cebu North Road) in Liloan
- N841 (United Nations Avenue) in Mandaue; N82 (A.C. Cortes Avenue) in Mandaue; N815 (Juan Luna Avenue) in Cebu; Cebu–Cordova Link Expressway in Cebu
- Southwest end: N8 (Natalio Bacalso Avenue) in Talisay

Location
- Country: Philippines
- Major cities: Mandaue, Cebu, Talisay
- Towns: Liloan, Consolacion

Highway system
- Roads in the Philippines; Highways; Expressways; List
← N830

National Route 840 (N840) is a major secondary route that forms part of the Philippine highway network. It serves a diversion road for both Cebu North Road and Natalio Bacalso Avenue/Cebu South Road (both N8), from Liloan to Talisay.

== Route description ==
=== Consolacion–Tayud–Liloan Road ===
N840 begins in a Y-junction with Cebu North Road (N8) as Consolacion–Tayud–Road in Liloan. It traverses Consolacion, which shares a barangay with the former in this road called Tayud. The road meets its end in Cansaga Bay Bridge.

=== Cansaga Bay Bridge ===
This separate portion that carries N840 is called the Cansaga Bay Bridge, connecting Mandaue and Consolacion.

=== Mayor Demetrio M. Cortes Avenue ===
N840 starts as Mayor Demetrio M. Cortes Avenue right after passing the Cansaga Bay Bridge. It intersects with United Nations Avenue (N841). The short segment ends in an intersection with A.C. Cortes Avenue (N82)

=== Ouano Avenue ===
After its intersection with A.C. Cortes Avenue (N82), N840 continues as Ouano Avenue. After passing the Ouano Bridge, the road takes a sharp turn. It traverses through the southern part of Mandaue, including the North Reclamation Area, being beside major buildings such as Bai Hotel Cebu and Cebu International Convention Center.

=== Second Avenue ===
N840 continues as Second Avenue right after leaving Mandaue and Ouano Avenue starting from the eponymous bridge. After the route reaches the MacArthur–Padilla Bridge, the Second Avenue section ends.

=== Sergio Osmeña Avenue ===
N840's continuation, the Sergio Osmeña Avenue, continues after the MacArthur–Padilla Bridge and Second Avenue. It continues as a straight six-land divided road until it ends in a junction with Legazpi Highway.

=== Cebu South Coastal Road ===
The four inner lanes from Sergio Osmeña Avenue continue in a tunnel and become the Cebu South Coastal Road. Once it exits the tunnel, it is carried by the Viaduct Bridge. Before the bridge ends, the Cebu–Cordova Link Expressway forms. Around this point, the kilometer count reverses due to it being south of the kilometer zero, making it parallel with Natalio Bacalso Avenue. After exiting the bridge, Route 840 enters and serves the general area of the South Road Properties, with it being adjacent to significant business centers including the SM Seaside City. The road enters Talisay where after a sharp turn, N840 ends in the Natalio Bacalso Avenue junction.

== Intersections ==
Intersections are numbered by kilometer posts, with Cebu Provincial Capitol in Cebu City designated as kilometer 0.

Province	City/Municipality	km	mi	Destinations	Notes
Cebu	Liloan	20.058	12.463	N8 (Cebu North Road)	Northern terminus in a Y-junction.
Cebu	Consolacion–Mandaue boundary			Cansaga Bay Bridge over Cansaga Bay	
Mandaue				N841 (United Nations Avenue)	Traffic light intersection
Mandaue				N82 (A.C. Cortes Avenue)	Traffic light intersection. Mayor Demetrio M. Cortes Avenue ends. Start of Ouano Avenue segment.
Mandaue				E.O. Perez Avenue	
Mahiga Creek				Second Avenue Bridge I and II	
Cebu City				Kaohsiung Street	
Cebu City				N815 (Juan Luna Avenue)	Traffic light intersection
Cebu City				5th Street	
Cebu City				V. Sotto Street – Cebu Pier III	Traffic light intersection. Access to Cebu Pier III
Cebu City				R. Palma Street	
Cebu City				Martires–Pier II Road – Cebu Pier II	Access to Cebu Pier II
Cebu City				North end of Cebu South Coastal Road Tunnel	
Cebu City				Legazpi Extension – Cebu Pier I	End of Sergio Osmeña Avenue, inner lanes continue as Cebu South Coastal Road. Access to Cebu Pier I
Cebu City				South end of Cebu South Coastal Road Tunnel	
Cebu City				Viaduct Bridge	
Cebu City				Cebu–Cordova Link Expressway – Cordova	Northbound only.
Cebu City				F. Vestil Street	
Cebu City				El Pardo Street	
Creek		10.418	6.473	Inayawan Bridge	
Cebu	Talisay			Rafael Rabaya Street	
Cebu	Talisay	16.372	10.173	N8 (Natalio Bacalso Avenue)	Southern terminus
1.000 mi = 1.609 km; 1.000 km = 0.621 mi: Incomplete access

== History ==
In December 16, 2008, the Cebu South Coastal Road was declared and converted into a national road. In December 22, 2023, the segment of the route called Plaridel Street was renamed to Mayor Demetrio M. Cortes Avenue.
