= Cebu North Road =

Road in Cebu, Philippines

Cebu North Road

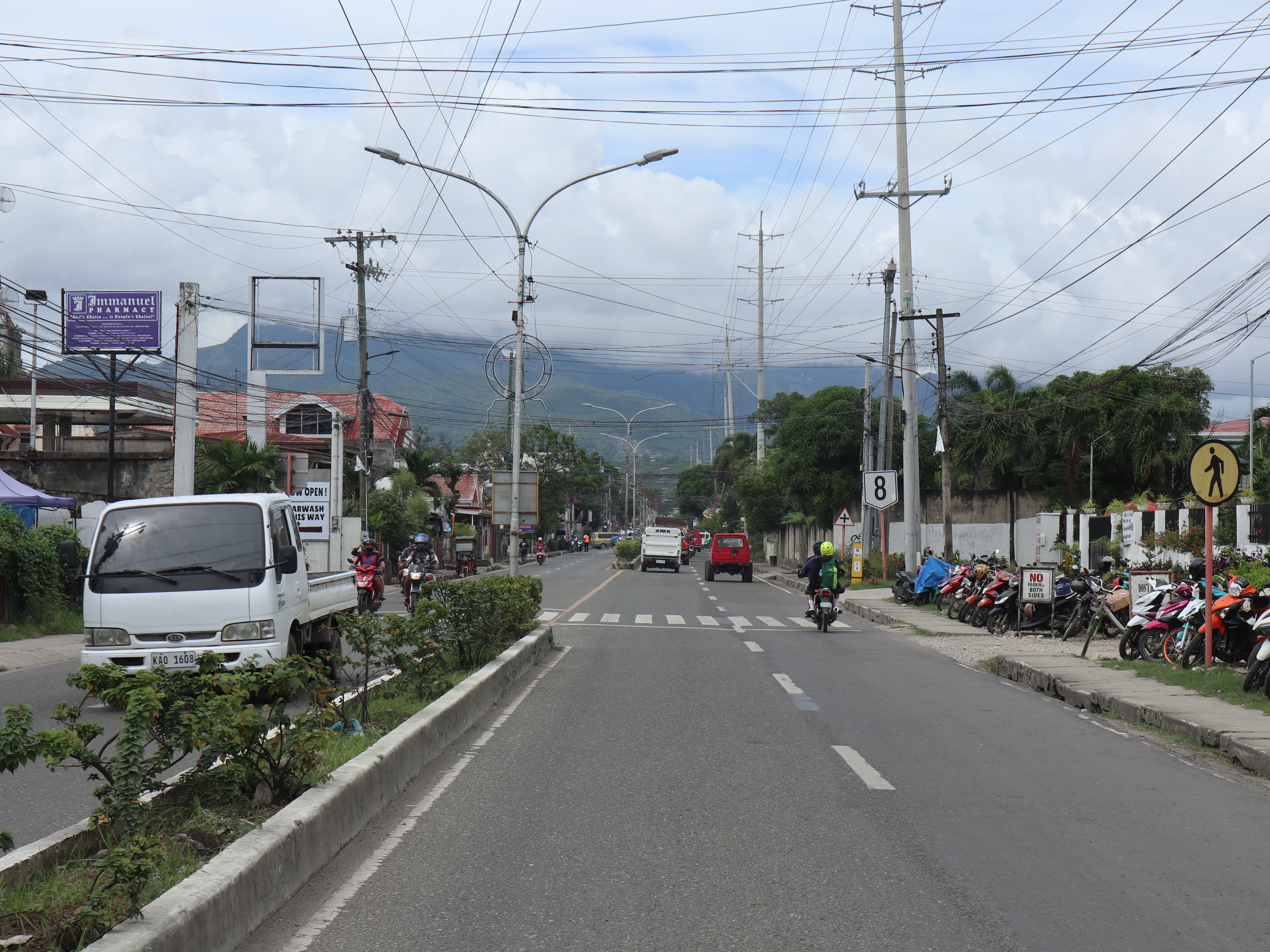
- The road in Danao

Route information
- Maintained by the Department of Public Works and Highways (DPWH)
- Length: 109.443 km (68.005 mi) Includes old section over Polambato River in Bogo
- Component highways: N8 from Cebu City to Danao; N810 from Danao to San Remegio

Major junctions
- South end: N. Escario Street in Cebu City
- N8 (Osmeña Boulevard / Natalio Bacalso Avenue) in Cebu City; N815 (Pope John Paul II Avenue / Juan Luna Avenue) in Cebu City; N82 (A.C. Cortes Avenue) in Mandaue; N841 (United Nations Avenue) in Mandaue; N840 (S.A. Lauron Avenue / Cansaga–Tayud Road) in Liloan; N820 (Antonio y De Pio Highway) in San Remigio
- North end: Port of Hagnaya in San Remigio

Location
- Country: Philippines
- Provinces: Cebu
- Major cities: Cebu City, Mandaue, Danao, Bogo
- Towns: Consolacion, Liloan, Compostela, Carmen, Catmon, Sogod, Borbon, Tabogon, San Remigio

Highway system
- Roads in the Philippines; Highways; Expressways; List

The Cebu North Road, also known as the Cebu North Hagnaya Wharf Road, is a 108.558-kilometer (67.455 mi) road, the major thoroughfare that connects the city of Cebu to the Port of Hagnaya in the municipality of San Remigio in Cebu, Philippines.

The road is a component of National Route 8 (N8) and the lone highway of National Route 810 (N810) of the Philippine highway network. It also forms part of the Central Nautical Highway of the Philippine Nautical Highway System.

== Route description ==
True to its name, Cebu North Road connects the capital Cebu City to the northern cities and municipalities of Cebu province. Outside Cebu City, it is alternatively called Cebu North Hagnaya Wharf Road.

=== Cebu City to Danao ===
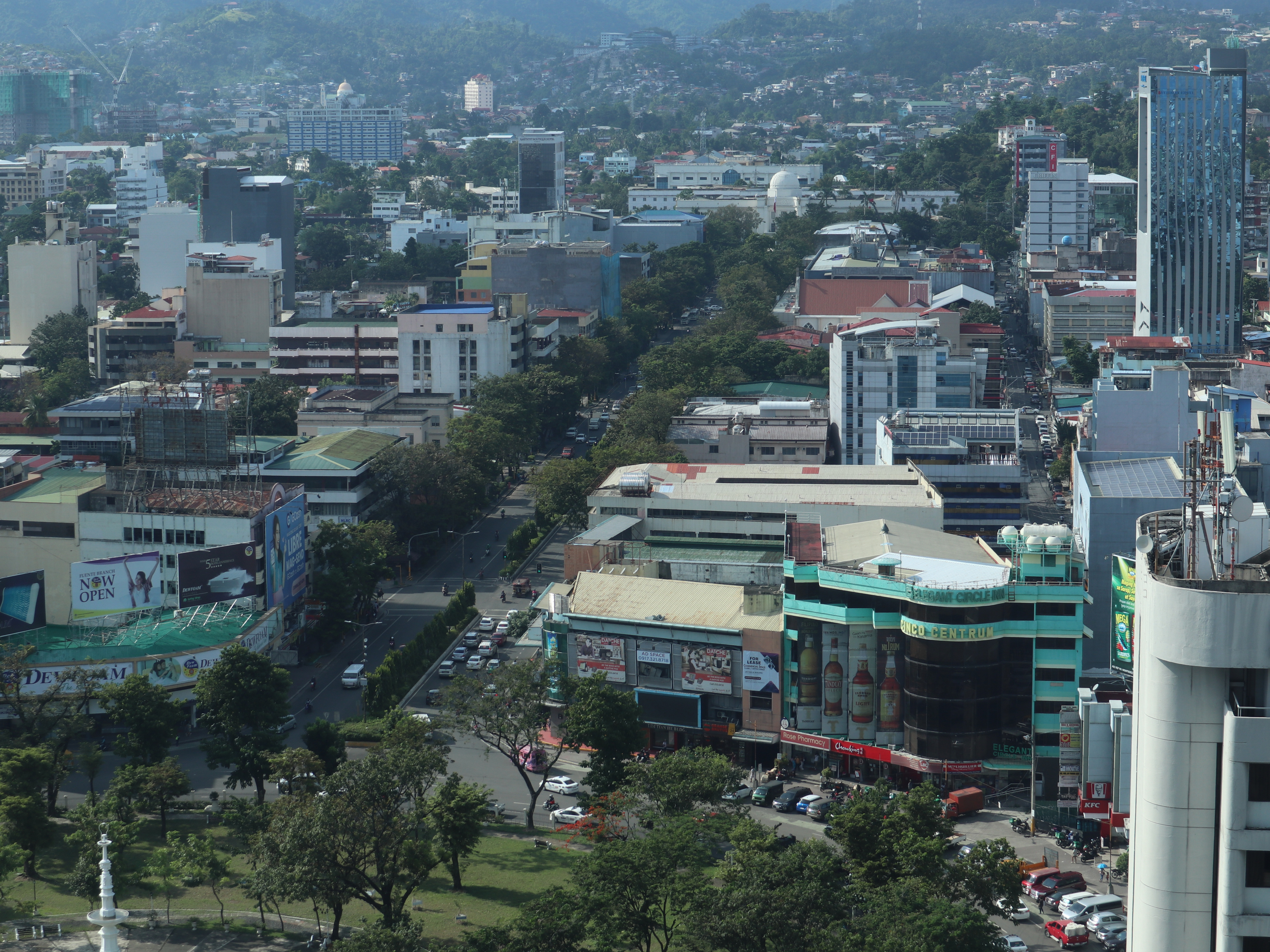
View of Osmeña Boulevard/Cebu North Road towards the Cebu Provincial Capitol from the Crown Regency Hotel and Towers complex

Cebu North Road begins at its intersection with N. Escario Street as Osmeña Boulevard, fronting the Cebu Provincial Capitol, in Cebu City. It then turns south towards the Fuente Osmeña Circle, where it turns west as General Maxilom Avenue until the road's intersection with M.J. Cuenco Avenue and Imus Avenue, where the road turns northeast toward the former. It then crosses an intersection with Pope John Paul II Avenue/Juan Luna Avenue (N815).

As the road enters Mandaue, it continues as Lopez-Jaena Street. After going underneath the Subangdako flyover at an intersection with Hernan Cortes Street, it continues as M.C. Briones Street. It then passes a junction with A.C. Cortes Avenue (N82) with a flyover carrying two-way through-traffic above it. After passing a junction with the United Nations Avenue (N841), it continues as the Cebu North Road. It then traverses the municipalities Consolacion, Liloan (where it begins to follow along the western coast of Cebu), and Compostela and the city of Danao.

=== Danao to San Remigio ===
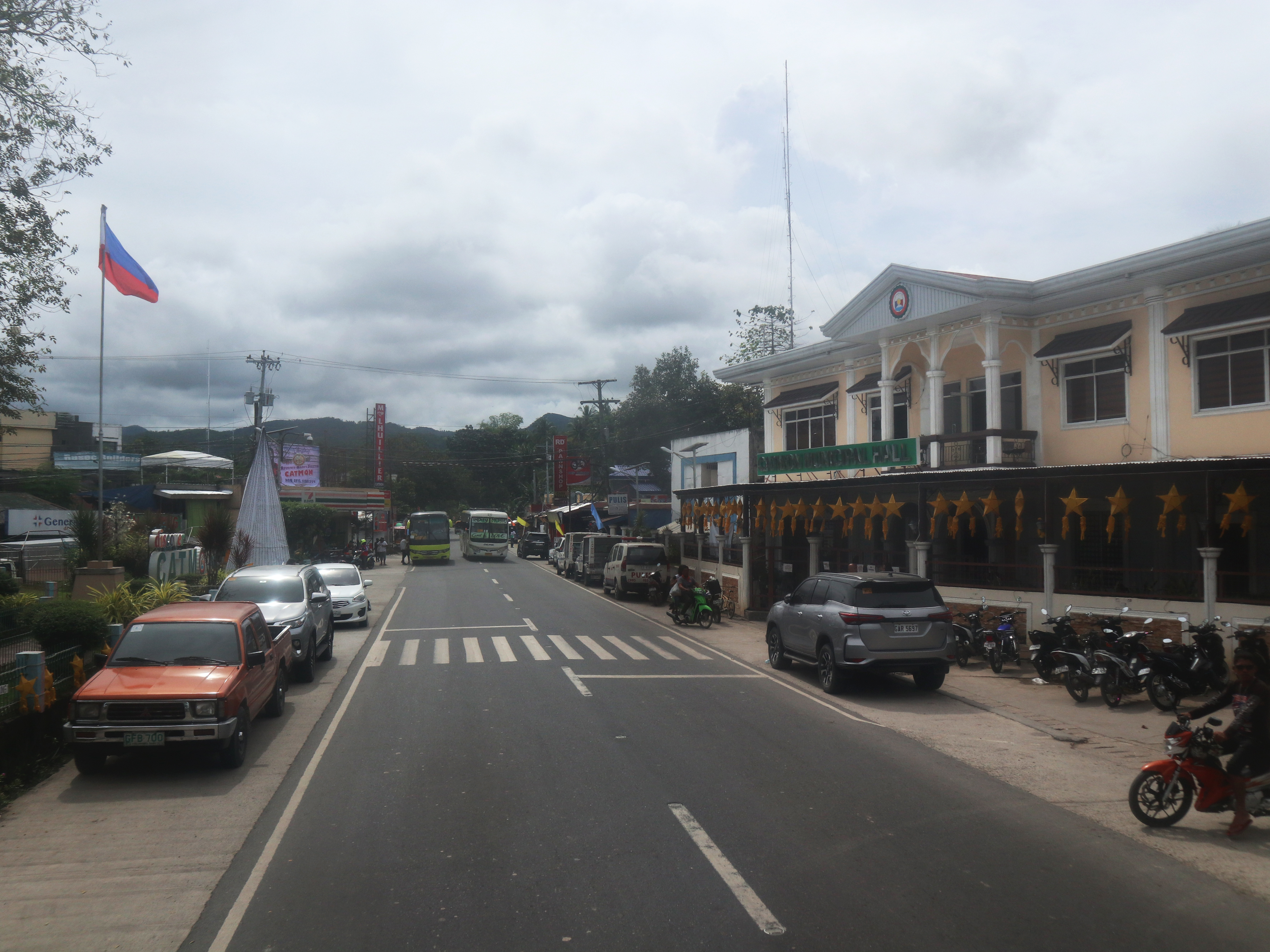
The road near the Catmon Municipal Hall in Catmon

At the vicinity of the D.T. Durano Memorial Integrated School past the Danao city proper, the route transitions from N8 to N810. The road then passes through the towns of Carmen, Catmon, Sogod (where it veers away from the western coast to cut through the mountains of Cebu), Borbon, and Tabogon before entering the city Bogo. In Bogo, the road turns west towards San Remigio. At a junction with the Antonio y De Pio Highway (N820) in San Remigio proper, the roads turns north, initially following the northeastern coast of Cebu. It terminates at the Port of Hagnaya, which has ferries linking Cebu island with Santa Fe in Bantayan Island and Cawayan in Masbate.

== History ==
The entire road historically forms part of Cebu Island's Highway 1 or Route 1 during the 20th century.

The road's eastern section in Cebu City was historically known as Calle Enrile (in honor of Governor-General Pasqual Enrile y Alcedo) and later Calle de los Martires (for being the site where Katipuneros and civilians were ordered killed after the Battle of Tres de Abril in 1898). On March 23, 1964, it was renamed to M.J. Cuenco Avenue after Cebu native and former Senate President Mariano Jesús Cuenco, by virtue of City Ordinance No. 462.

== Intersections ==
Intersections are numbered by kilometer posts, with Cebu Provincial Capitol in Cebu City designated as kilometer zero.

Province	City/Municipality	km	mi	Destinations	Notes
Cebu City		0	0.0	N. Escario Street	Southern terminus
Cebu City		0.88	0.55	N8 (Osmeña Boulevard/Natalio Bacalso Avenue) / B. Rodriguez Street / Don Gil Garcia Street	Roundabout
Cebu City		3.6	2.2	N815 (Pope John Paul II Avenue, Juan Luna Avenue)	
Mandaue		7.2	4.5	N82 (A.C. Cortes Avenue)	Crossing traffic is carried by Maguikay Flyover.
Mandaue		8.27	5.14	N841 (United Nations Avenue)	
Cebu	Liloan	8.22	5.11	N840 (S.A. Lauron Avenue, Cansaga–Tayud Road)	
Cebu	Danao	33.45	20.78	Route change from N8 to N810	
Cebu	San Remigio	107.05	66.52	N820 (Antonio y De Pio Highway)	
Cebu	San Remigio	109.336	67.938	Port of Hagnaya	Northern terminus
1.000 mi = 1.609 km; 1.000 km = 0.621 mi: Route transition
