= N82 highway =

Road in the Philippines

Route 82

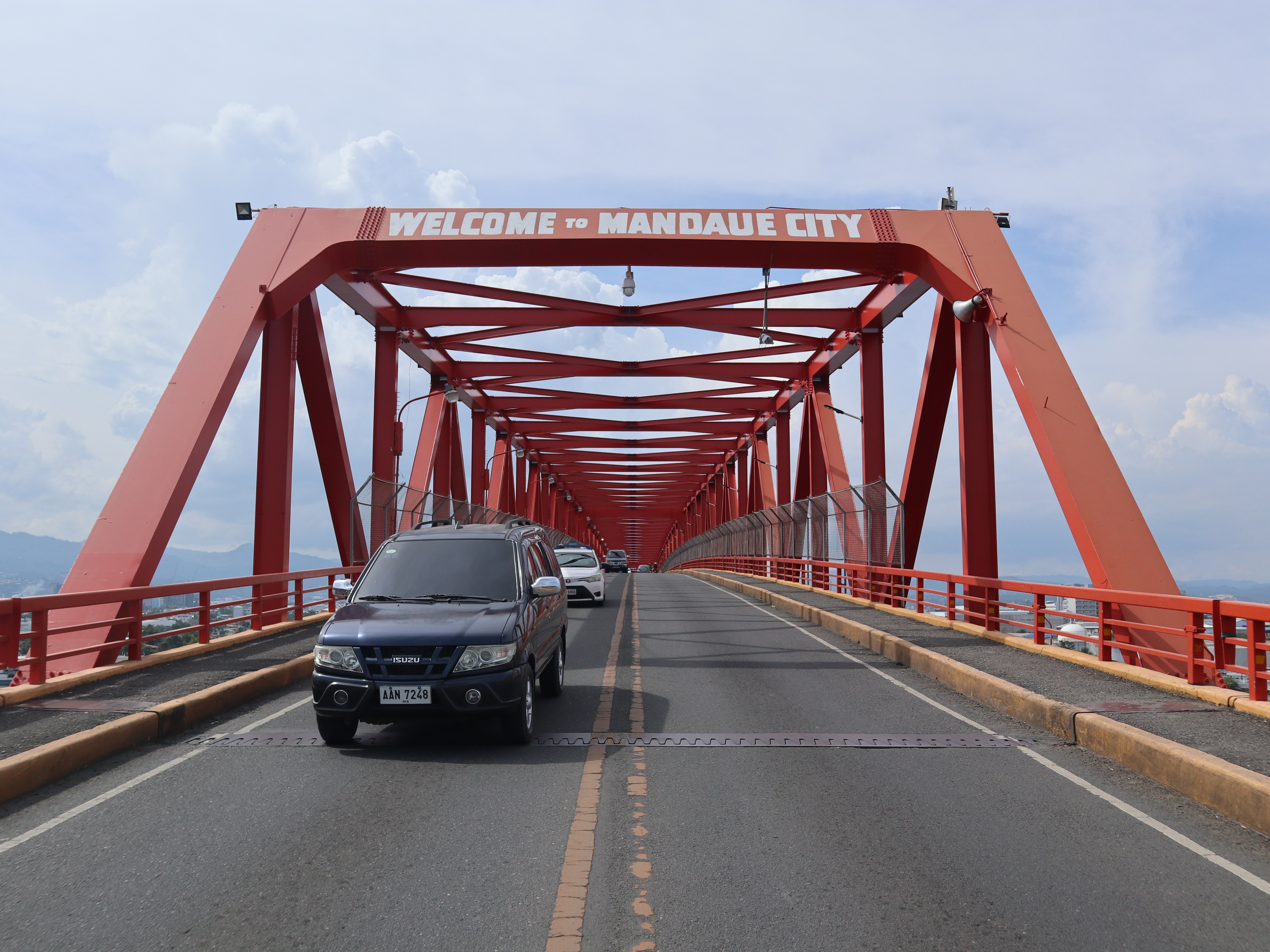
- Sergio Osmeña Bridge (Mactan-Mandaue Bridge), the bridge that carries the said route.

Major junctions
- East end: N8 (M.C. Briones Avenue / Cebu North Road) in Mandaue
- West end: N845 (Mactan Circumferential National Road) in Lapu-Lapu City

Location
- Country: Philippines

Highway system
- Roads in the Philippines; Highways; Expressways; List
| ← N81 | → N83 |

National Route 82 (N82) is a 5 km (3.1 mi) minor primary route connecting the cities of Lapu-Lapu and Mandaue. It is the second shortest primary route, the first being the N61 highway in Metro Manila. It is iconic for being the first highway to link Cebu and Mactan Island, the next two being N841 and Cebu–Cordova Link Expressway.

== History ==
The roads, including the bridge were constructed in the 1970s. During late 2016, route markers were placed, one of them being N82.

== Route description ==
N82 starts in Mandaue as A.C. Cortes Avenue from its intersection with M.C. Briones Street/Cebu North Road (N8) and Manuel L. Quezon Avenue. The route becomes the Mactan-Mandaue Bridge, also known as the Sergio Osmeña Bridge. After crossing the bridge, the route becomes the Maximo V. Patalinjug, Jr. Avenue. The route becomes the Basak–Marigondon Road after crossing the General Aviation Road. The route ends when its divided highway section merges after almost two kilometers after its intersection with the Mactan Circumferential National Road (N845).

== Intersections ==
Intersections are numbered by kilometer posts, with Cebu Provincial Capitol in Cebu City designated as kilometer 0.

| Province | City/Municipality | km | mi | Destinations | Notes |
|---|---|---|---|---|---|
| Mandaue | | | | N8 (Cebu North Road) | Western terminus |
| Mandaue | | | | N840 (Mayor Demetrio M. Cortes Avenue / Ouano Avenue) | |
| Mactan Channel | | | | Mandaue—Mactan Bridge | |
| Lapu-Lapu | | | | N845 (Mactan Circumferential Road) | |
| Lapu-Lapu | | | | Opon–Airport Road | |
| Lapu-Lapu | | | | Southern terminus of N82 as Pajo–Basak–Marigondon Road becomes a local road | |
1.000 mi = 1.609 km; 1.000 km = 0.621 mi
