= Miss Universe Philippines Cebu 2024 =

1st Miss Universe Philippines Cebu pageant

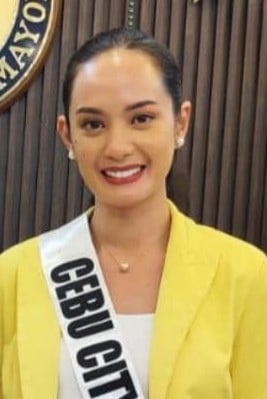
- Kris Tiffany Janson
- Date: February 3, 2024
- Presenters: Andrew Wolff; Steffi Rose Aberasturi
- Entertainment: Apollo Young
- Theme: Confidently Beautiful Cebuanas
- Venue: Waterfront Cebu City Hotel & Casino, Cebu City, Philippines
- Entrants: 20
- Placements: 10
- Winner: Kris Tiffany Janson; Cebu City North
- Congeniality: Juvel Ducay; Bantayan Island
- Photogenic: Chase Svea Toledo; Aloguinsan

Miss Universe Philippines Cebu 2024 was the first Miss Universe Philippines Cebu pageant under the Accredited Partners program, held at the Waterfront Hotel & Casino in Cebu City, Philippines, on February 3, 2024.

At the end of the event, Kris Tiffany Janson was crowned as Miss Universe Philippines Cebu 2024. Janson represented Cebu in the Miss Universe Philippines 2024.

Jewel Ducay of Bantayan Island was also crowned as Miss Universe Philippines Cebu Tourism, Nica Zosa Nabua of Minglanilla as Miss Universe Philippines Cebu Charity and Mary Josephine Paasko of Talisay as Miss Universe Philippines Cebu Heritage. All of them will represent their municipalities respectively together with Cebu Province in the Miss Universe Philippines 2024.

Natasha Testa of Lapu-Lapu was crowned as The Miss Philippines Cebu and will represent the province at The Miss Philippines 2024 together with the Mipsen Calves of Carcar, Miss Universe Philippines Cebu 1st Runner up and Thelma Suzanne Dayao of San Fernando, Miss Universe Philippines Cebu 2nd Runner up.

== Background ==
=== Accredited Partners ===
On September 14, 2023, Shamcey Supsup-Lee, together with Jocelyn Tagulao, Irma Bitzer and Danny Booc, signed the Accredited Partnership agreement between the Miss Universe Philippines and the Miss Universe Philippines Cebu.

=== Selection of participants ===
On October 18, 2023, the organization launched its search for the next Cebuanas who would represent the Cebu at the Miss Universe Philippines 2024 competition. It was held at the Mediterranean Ballroom at Waterfront Cebu City Hotel and Casino. On December 14, 2023, the twenty-four contestants were announced in their official social media accounts, and presented during the Sashing Ceremony and Media Presentation last December 23, 2023, at the Cube Wing, SM Seaside City Cebu.

=== Location and date ===
On January 15, 2024, the organization announced that the coronation will be held on February 3, 2024, at the Pacific Grand Ballroom, Waterfront Hotel Cebu City and Casino.

== Results ==
=== Placements ===
Placement	Contestant
Miss Universe Philippines Cebu 2024	Cebu City North – Kris Tiffany Janson
Miss Universe Philippines Cebu Tourism 2024 (Designated as Miss Universe Philippines - Bantayan Island)	Bantayan Island – Juvel Ducay
Miss Universe Philippines Cebu Charity 2024 (Designated as Miss Universe Philippines - Minglanilla)	Minglanilla – Nica Zosa Nabua
Miss Universe Philippines Cebu Heritage 2024 (Designated as Miss Universe Philippines - Talisay)	Talisay – Mary Josephine Paaske
The Miss Philippines Cebu 2024	Lapu-Lapu – Natasha Testa
1st Runner-Up (Designated as The Miss Philippines - Carcar)	Carcar – Mipsen Calves
2nd Runner-Up (Designated as The Miss Philippines - San Fernando)	San Fernando – Thelma Suzanne Dayao
Top 10	Alegria – Michaela Batausa; Dumanjug – Phyllis Saromines; Tuburan – Kathleen Hermoso Gabunada

==== Special awards ====
Award	Contestant
Miss Friendship - RDT Personality	Bantayan Island – Juvel Ducay
Miss Photogenic by Waterfront	Aloguinsan – Chase Svea Toledo
Best in Tourism Video	Carcar – Mipsen Calves
Best in Swimsuit	Talisay – Mary Josephine Paaske
Best in Evening Gown	Cebu City North – Kris Tiffany Janson
Best Designer in Evening Gown	Carcar – Mipsen Calves

==== Corporate awards ====
Award	Contestant
Miss Skin Dip	Bantayan Island – Juvel Ducay
Miss Oro Galleria	Cebu City North – Kris Tiffany Janson
Miss Myra Standout Beauty	Cebu City North – Kris Tiffany Janson
Miss Bean Leaf	Badian – Jezel Carriaga
Miss Esteem Medica	Cebu City North – Kris Tiffany Janson
Miss Tuburan 360	Bantayan Island – Juvel Ducay
Miss Skin 911 Medical	Talisay – Mary Josephine Paaske
Miss Anytime Fitness	Tuburan – Kathleen Gabunada
Miss Vote Lab Philippines	Dumanjug – Phyllis Saromines

== Pageant ==
=== Preliminary competition ===
The preliminary competition and gala night was held at the Waterfront Cebu City Hotel and Casino on January 28, 2024.

=== Final program ===
The coronation night was held at the Waterfront Cebu City Hotel and Casino on February 4, 2024. It was hosted by Mister Philippines 2012 and Mister World 2012 First Runner-up, Andrew Wolff and Binibining Cebu 2018 and Miss Universe Philippines 2021 Second Runner-up, Steffi Rose Abersturi. Apollo Young performed as guest artist.

The funwear for the finals was designed by Cebu-based Fashion Institute of the Philippines and the swimwear was designed by Cebu-based Bezza.

==== Judges ====
- Tessie Hean Nakao
- Eleanor Velasco
- Rowea Simpson
- Fiona Lideza
- Jully Padillo
- Lloyd Lee
- Shamcey Supsup-Lee
- Liz Tagima Cruz
- Robert Tagulao
- Ronnie Gundran
- Beverly Dayanan
- Abagail Masongsong

== Contestants ==
20 delegates competed for the title.

Municipality/City	Contestant
Alegria	Michaela Batausa
Aloguinsan	Chase Svea Toledo
Argao	Rebecca Anne Dollisen
Argao, Poblacion	Kate Antonette Remoroza
Badian	Jezel Carriaga
Bantayan Island	Juvel Ducay
Carcar	Mipsen Calves
Cebu City North	Kris Tiffany Janson
Cebu City South	Rhean Khraze Guirhem
Compostela	Demi Hailey dela Calzada
Daanbantayan	Johana Maecailah Fortich
Danao	Stefanie Alcarez
Dumanjug	Phyllis Saromines
Lapu-Lapu	Natasha Testa
Medellin	Blanche Comecilla
Minglanilla	Nica Zosa Nabua
Naga	Ella Frances
San Fernando	Telma Suzanne Dayao
Talisay	Mary Josephine Paaske
Tuburan	Kathleen Hermoso Gabunada
