= N815 highway =

Road in the Philippines

Route 815

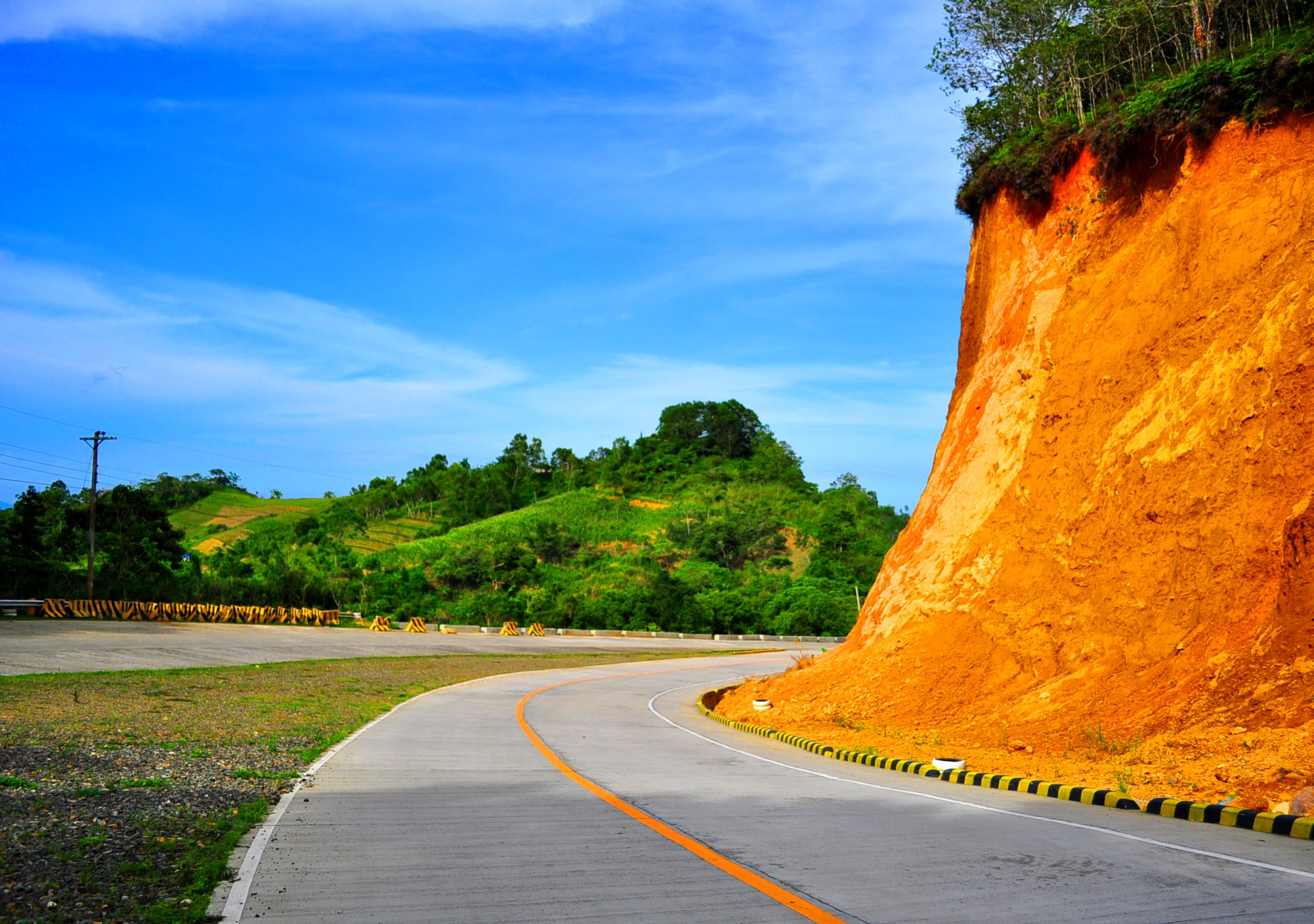
- Cebu–Balamban Transcentral Highway

Major junctions
- East end: N840 (Sergio Osmeña Avenue) in Cebu
- N8 (M.J. Cuenco Avenue/Cebu North Road) in Cebu; N816 (Wilson Street/Lower Torralba Street) in Cebu; Metro Cebu Expressway in Cebu
- West end: N820 (Toledo–Tabuelan–San Remigio Road)

Location
- Country: Philippines
- Municipalities: Balamban
- Major cities: Cebu

Highway system
- Roads in the Philippines; Highways; Expressways; List
← N810	→ N816

National Route 815 (N815) is a national secondary route that forms part of the Philippine highway network, connecting the city of Cebu and the municipality of Balamban.

== Route description ==
=== 8th Street ===
National Route 815 starts as a divided highway named 8th Street. The road becomes one before passing the San Jose Dela Montaña Bridge. This section ends in its intersection with Cebu North Road (N8).

=== Juan Luna Avenue ===
Route 815 becomes Juan Luna Avenue from a junction with Sergio Osmeña Avenue (N840) in the North Reclamation Area within Mabolo.

=== Pope John Paul II Avenue ===
The route continues as Pope John Paul II Avenue after crossing M.J. Cuenco Avenue/Cebu North Road (N8). It continues as Salinas Drive after passing underneath the Archbishop Reyes–M. Cuenco flyover through the Lahug-Kasambagan border.

N815 passes a junction with Wilson Street, which is used to access the partially-restricted Lower Torralba Street inside of Camp Lapu-Lapu, the regional military headquarters.

=== Veterans Drive ===
The route continues as Veterans Drive after a three-way intersection with Salinas Drive and Gorordo Avenue.

=== Cebu-Balamban Transcentral Highway ===
It traverses the Central Cebu Protected Landscape and continues as the Cebu-Balamban Transcentral Highway once it leaves the boundary limits of Cebu City, entering Balamban. It terminates within the Balamban municipality proper at a junction with Toledo–Tabuelan–San Remigio Road (N820).

=== Hazards ===
The Cebu–Balamban Transcentral Highway portion of the route is notorious for having many turns and being very prone to accidents. It is also notorious for landslides that often happen during or after heavy downpours. One of the landslides left 11 vehicles damaged in 2017. The road has numerous stretches of ascending and descending portions. A bus fell off a 30-meter (98 ft) ravine after a sharp turn; the accident killed 21 foreign medical students.

== Intersections ==
Kilometer posts are not properly added until the Cebu–Balamban Transcentral Highway Section. Intersections are numbered by kilometer posts, with Cebu Provincial Capitol in Cebu City designated as kilometer 0.

Province	City/Municipality	km	mi	Destinations	Notes
Cebu City				N840 (2nd Avenue)	Eastern terminus
Cebu City				N8 (Cebu North Road)	Traffic light intersection
Cebu City				F. Cabahug Extension	Traffic light intersection
Cebu City				Governor Cuenco Avenue	Traffic light intersection
Cebu City				N816 (Camp Lapu-Lapu Road) – Camp Lapu Lapu	Initial road is accessible but full access to Camp Lapu-Lapu is restricted to authorized personnel.
Cebu City		4.567	2.838	Gorordo Avenue	Start of kilometer count
Cebu City				Metro Cebu Expressway	Under construction
Cebu	Balamban			N820 (Toledo–Tabuelan–San Remigio Road)	Western terminus
1.000 mi = 1.609 km; 1.000 km = 0.621 mi: Incomplete access; Unopened

== See also ==
- Media related to Cebu Transcentral Highway at Wikimedia Commons
