= Binibining Pilipinas 2014 =

51st Binibining Pilipinas pageant

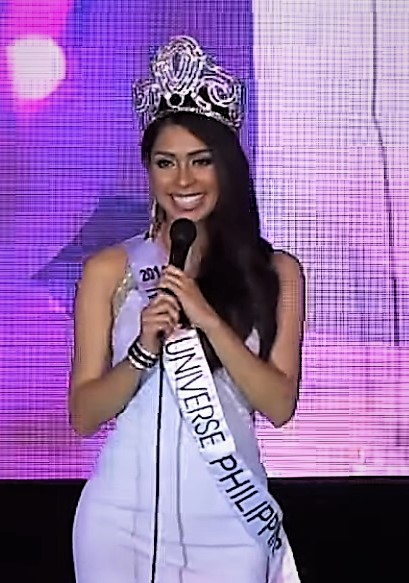
- Mary Jean Lastimosa, Miss Universe Philippines 2014
- Date: March 30, 2014
- Presenters: Xian Lim; Anne Curtis; Shamcey Supsup-Lee; Venus Raj; Janine Tugonon
- Entertainment: Emin
- Venue: Smart Araneta Coliseum, Quezon City, Metro Manila, Philippines
- Broadcaster: ABS-CBN
- Entrants: 40
- Placements: 15
- Winner: Mary Jean Lastimosa; Cotabato
- Congeniality: Racquel Kabigting; Bataan
- Best National Costume: Kris Tiffany Janson; Cebu City
- Photogenic: Kris Tiffany Janson; Cebu City

Binibining Pilipinas 2014 was the 51st edition of the Binibining Pilipinas. It was held at the Smart Araneta Coliseum in Quezon City, Metro Manila, Philippines on March 30, 2014.

At the end of the event, Ariella Arida crowned Mary Jean Lastimosa as Miss Universe Philippines 2014, Bea Santiago crowned Bianca Guidotti as Binibining Pilipinas International 2014, Mutya Johanna Datul crowned Yvethe Marie Santiago as Binibining Pilipinas Supranational 2014, and Cindy Miranda crowned Parul Shah as Binibining Pilipinas Tourism 2014. A new title, Binibining Pilipinas Intercontinental 2014, was awarded by Melanie Marquez to Kris Tiffany Janson. Laura Lehmann was named First Runner-Up and Hannah Ruth Sison was named Second Runner-Up.

Prior to the pageant night, a special primer called Binibining Pilipinas: Road to the Crown was aired on ABS-CBN on March 23, 2014.

== Results ==
Color keys

- The contestant was a Runner-up in an International pageant.
- The contestant was a Semi-Finalist in an International pageant.
- The contestant did not place.

Placement	Contestant	International Placement
Miss Universe Philippines 2014	Bb. #25 – Mary Jean Lastimosa	Top 10 – Miss Universe 2014
Binibining Pilipinas International 2014	Bb. #22 – Mary Anne Bianca Guidotti	Unplaced – Miss International 2014
Binibining Pilipinas Supranational 2014	Bb. #35 – Yvethe Marie Santiago	Top 20 – Miss Supranational 2014
Binibining Pilipinas Intercontinental 2014	Bb. #13 – Kris Tiffany Janson	2nd Runner-Up – Miss Intercontinental 2014
Binibining Pilipinas Tourism 2014	Bb. #4 – Parul Shah (Appointed as Binibining Pilipinas Grand International 2015)	3rd Runner-Up – Miss Grand International 2015
1st Runner-Up	Bb. #11 – Laura Victoria Lehmann	
2nd Runner-Up	Bb. #27 – Hannah Ruth Sison	
Top 15	Bb. #1 – Julian Aurine Flores; Bb. #3 – Joana Angelica Romero; Bb. #8 – Pia Wurtzbach; Bb. #14 – Emma Tiglao; Bb. #16 – Zahara Mae Soriano; Bb. #19 – Mae Liezel Ramos; Bb. #23 – Nichole Marie Manalo; Bb. #35 – Kenneth Santiago	

=== Special Awards ===
Award	Contestant	Ref.
Bb. Friendship	Bb. #21 – Racquel Kabigting	
Bb. Talent	Bb. #33 – Gabrielle Erika Tilokani	
Bb. Best in National Costume	Bb. #13 – Kris Tiffany Janson	
Face of Bb. Pilipinas (Bb. Photogenic)	Bb. #13 – Kris Tiffany Janson	
Lactacyd's Bb. Best in Swimsuit	Bb. #25 – Mary Jean Lastimosa	
Bb. Best in Long Gown	Bb. #22 – Mary Anne Bianca Guidotti	
Miss Philippine Airlines	Bb. #8 – Pia Wurtzbach	
She's So Jag Award	Bb. #8 – Pia Wurtzbach	
Bb. Avon	Bb. #35 – Yvethe Marie Santiago	
Miss Creamsilk	Bb. #35 – Yvethe Marie Santiago	
Bb. Manila Bulletin Readers' Choice Award	Bb. #39 – Ladylyn Riva	

== Judges ==
- Gabriela Isler – Miss Universe 2013 from Venezuela
- Jeron Teng – Small forward of the De La Salle Green Archers UAAP men's basketball team
- Adam Laker – General Manager of Sofitel Philippine Plaza
- Cory Vidanes – ABS-CBN Corporation Channel Head
- William Christopher – United States' Consul Officer
- Gregory Domingo – Secretary of the Department of Trade and Industry
- Kevin L. Tan – Vice President of Megaworld Corporation
- Korina Sanchez – News Anchor and Chief Correspondent of the ABS-CBN Integrated News and Current Affairs
- Carlo L. Katigbak – President and Chief Executive Officer of Skycable
- Julio Camarena – Mexico's Ambassador to the Philippines
- Juan Edgardo Angara – Incumbent Senator of the Philippines

== Contestants ==
40 contestants competed for the five titles.

No.	Contestant	Age (Note: Ages at the time of the pageant)	Hometown
1	Julian Aurine Flores	23	Manila
2	Mary Ainjely Manalo	21	Pasay
3	Joana Angelica Romero	24	Naga
4	Parul Shah	25	Pangasinan
5	Hannah Mariz dela Guerra	21	Mandaluyong
6	Anabel Christine Tia	25	Ozamiz
7	Aiza Faeldonia	24	Isulan
8	Pia Wurtzbach	24	Cagayan de Oro
9	Joy Antonette Diaz	26	Dagupan
10	Shauna Indra Salina Curran	22	Cordillera
11	Laura Victoria Lehmann	19	Makati
12	Sarah Jireh Asido	23	Balagtas
13	Kris Tiffany Janson	24	Cebu City
14	Emma Mary Tiglao	19	Mabalacat
15	Kimverlyn Suiza	25	Marikina
16	Zahara Mae Soriano	20	Negros Oriental
17	Diana Arevalo	25	Calapan
18	Ellore Noelle Punzalan	26	Las Piñas
19	Mae Liezel Ramos	23	Camarines Sur
20	Kenneth Santiago	22	Nueva Ecija
21	Racquel Kabigting	22	Mariveles
22	Mary Anne Bianca Guidotti	24	Taguig
23	Nichole Marie Manalo	24	Parañaque
24	Ednornance Agustin	23	Mandaluyong
25	Mary Jean Lastimosa	26	Cotabato
26	Hannah Sheena Manuel	22	Tuguegarao
27	Hannah Ruth Sison	25	Makati
28	Carla Jenina Lizardo	24	Pasig
29	Krischelle Halili	23	Tarlac City
30	Joy Marie Gangan	19	Ilagan
31	Angelique Celine de Leon	23	Mandaluyong
32	Jeslyn Santos	21	Hagonoy
33	Gabrielle Erika Tilokani	22	Mandaluyong
34	Leonalyn dela Cruz	23	Caloocan
35	Yvethe Marie Santiago	19	Daraga
36	Krystal Alonday	22	Paombong
37	Vanessa Saliba	18	Tanay
38	Janine Asanion	25	Zambales
39	Ladylyn Riva	26	Aklan
40	Vessica Sambo	21	Malolos

== Notes ==
=== Post-pageant notes ===
- Mary Jean Lastimosa competed at Miss Universe 2014 in Doral, Florida and finished as one of the Top 10 finalists.
- Mary Anne Bianca Guidotti competed at Miss International 2014 in Tokyo, Japan where she was unplaced.
- Yvethe Marie Santiago competed at Miss Supranational 2014 in Krynica-Zdroj, Poland where she finished as one of the Top 20 semifinalists.
- Kris Tiffany Janson competed at Miss Intercontinental 2014 in Magdeburg, Germany where she finished as second runner-up. Prior to being called as Second Runner-Up, Janson and Miss Thailand, Patraporn Wang, tied when the supposedly five finalists are being announced, making them six finalists instead of five. Due to this, Janson, together with Wang, both won the Miss Intercontinental Asia & Oceania award.
- Parul Shah competed at Miss Grand International 2015 in Bangkok, Thailand where she finished as Third Runner-Up. Early in the competition, Shah won the Best in National Costume award.
- Both Hannah Ruth Sison and Kimverlyn Suiza competed at Binibining Pilipinas 2015. Sison finished as First Runner-Up, while Suiza finished as Second Runner-Up.
- Pia Wurtzbach also competed at Binibining Pilipinas 2015 where she was crowned Binibining Pilipinas Universe 2015. She competed at Miss Universe 2015 in Las Vegas, Nevada and won. Wurtzbach is the third Miss Universe from the Philippines.
- Nichole Manalo later competed at Binibining Pilipinas 2016 and was crowned Binibining Pilipinas Globe 2016. She competed at Globe 2016 and finished as Third Runner-Up. Initially, Manalo only finished as one of the Top 10 finalists but a week after the pageant, Manalo, together with Natasha Joubert of South Africa, was proclaimed as Third and Fourth Runner-Up respectively. The reason why the Third and Fourth Runners-Up were announced late is that the emcees of the pageant weren't able to read the envelopes in time.
- Laura Lehmann later competed at Miss World Philippines and was crowned Miss World Philippines 2017. She competed at Miss World 2017 in Sanya, China and finished as a Top 40 quarter-finalist. Lehmann is also among the five winners of Beauty with a Purpose, part of the Top 10 for the People's Choice award, and one of the winners of the Head to Head Challenge.
