= Kinatarkan =

Island in Cebu, Philippines

Kinatarkan Kinatarcan / Guintarcan / Batbatan
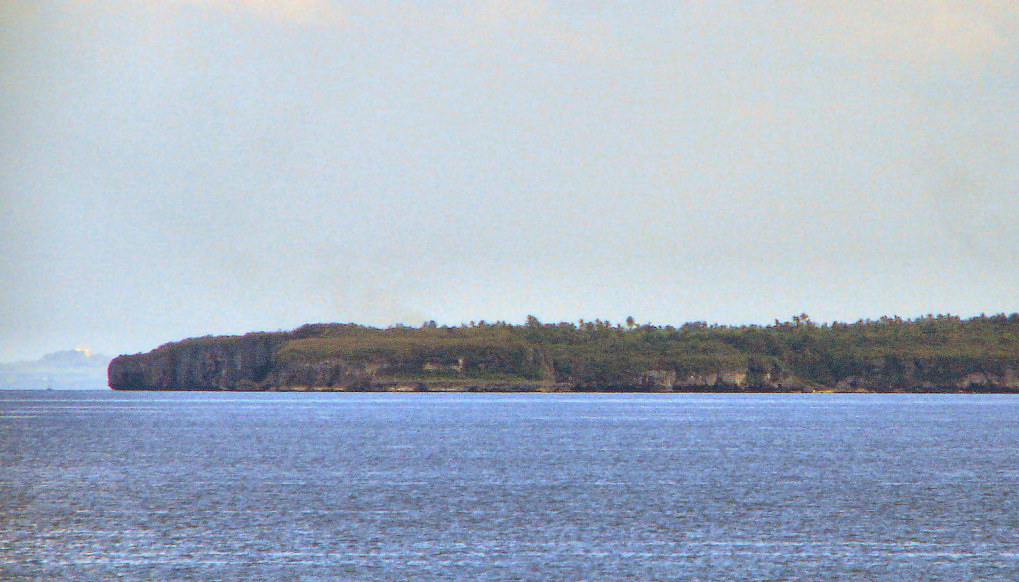
- Southern portion of Guintacan Island

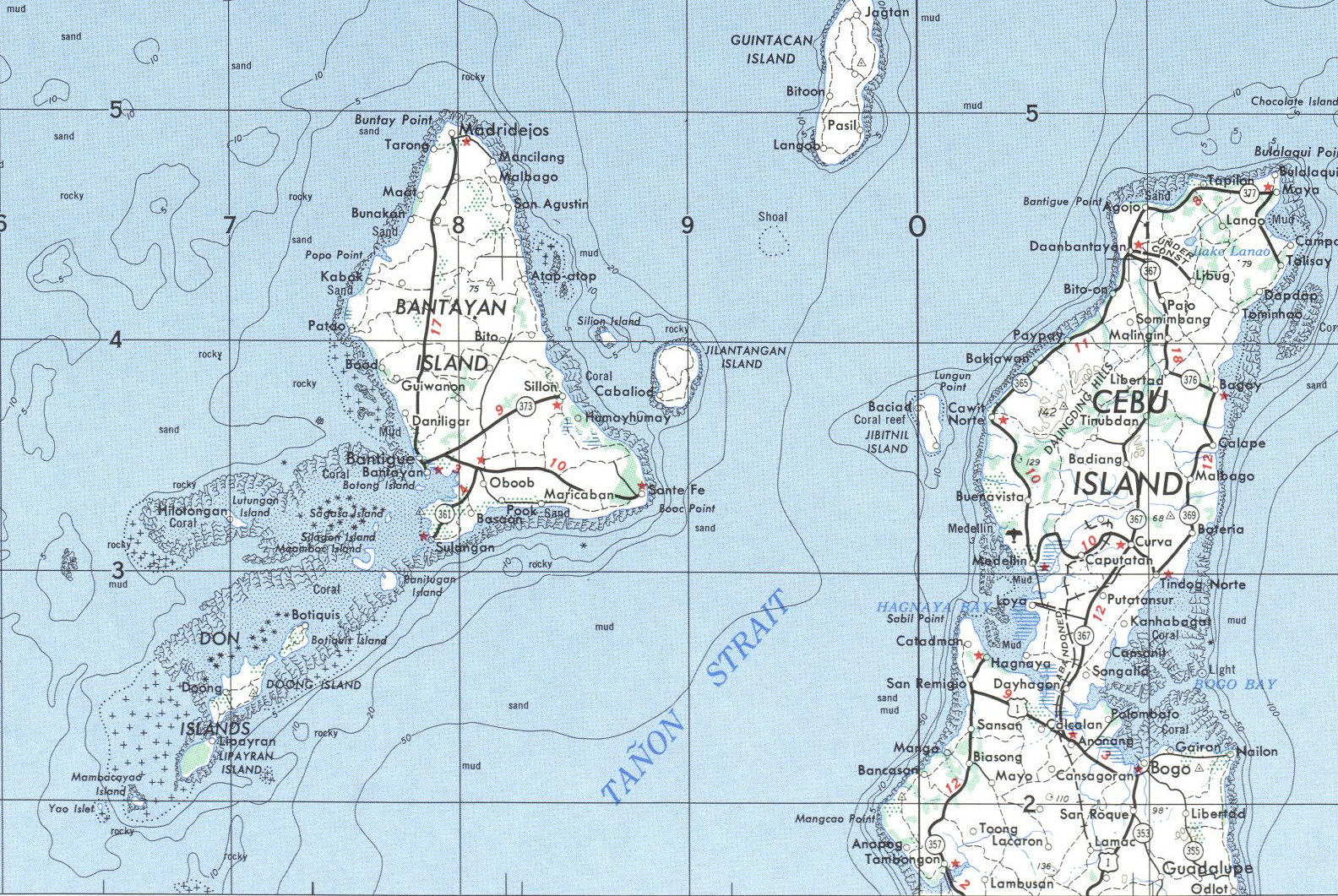
- Location within Bantayan Island

Geography
- Location: Visayan Sea
- Coordinates: 11.325°N 123.8917°E
- Area: 13.34108 km^{2} (5.15102 sq mi)
- Length: 6.8 km (4.23 mi)
- Width: 2.5 km (1.55 mi)

Administration
- Philippines
- Region: Central Visayas (Region VII)
- Province: Santa Fe
- Municipality: Santa Fe

Demographics
- Population: 7,208 (2015 census)
- Pop. density: 540/km^{2} (1400/sq mi)

Kinatarkan, also spelled as Kinatarcan and also known as Guintarcan, is an island of the province of Cebu in the Philippines. It lies about 25 kilometres (16 miles) off the west coast of Cebu and 12 kilometres (7 mi) northeast from Bantayan Island. The island is within the municipality of Santa Fe and comprises three barangays: Hagdan, Kinatarkan and Langub.

The island has an elongated elliptical shape, about 6.8 kilometres (4.2 mi) long (N-S) and 2.5 kilometres (1.6 mi) wide (E-W). Offshore are numerous coral reefs and seagrass beds. The topography of the island is hilly and along the eastern coastline is a large lagoon. (Note: "Mysterious Lagoon" tourist spot) The coast of the island is dominated by numerous towering rock cliffs, which are interrupted by some flat beaches. The vegetation of the island consists of dense tropical vegetation, in the interior there are also large intensive agricultural areas.

A number of sinkholes have formed at various locations on the island. While one appeared in 2014, it is thought that others had developed some years earlier. As from August 2014 their cause is still being assessed.

The island can be reached by ferry from Daanbantayan, and from Santa Fe by pump boat. There is a lighthouse - LS Guintarcan - to the southeast of the island (⛯ 11°18′06″N 123°53′28″E).
