= Silion =

Silion: Hilantagaan Diot; Pulo Diyot; Virgin Island
- Isle
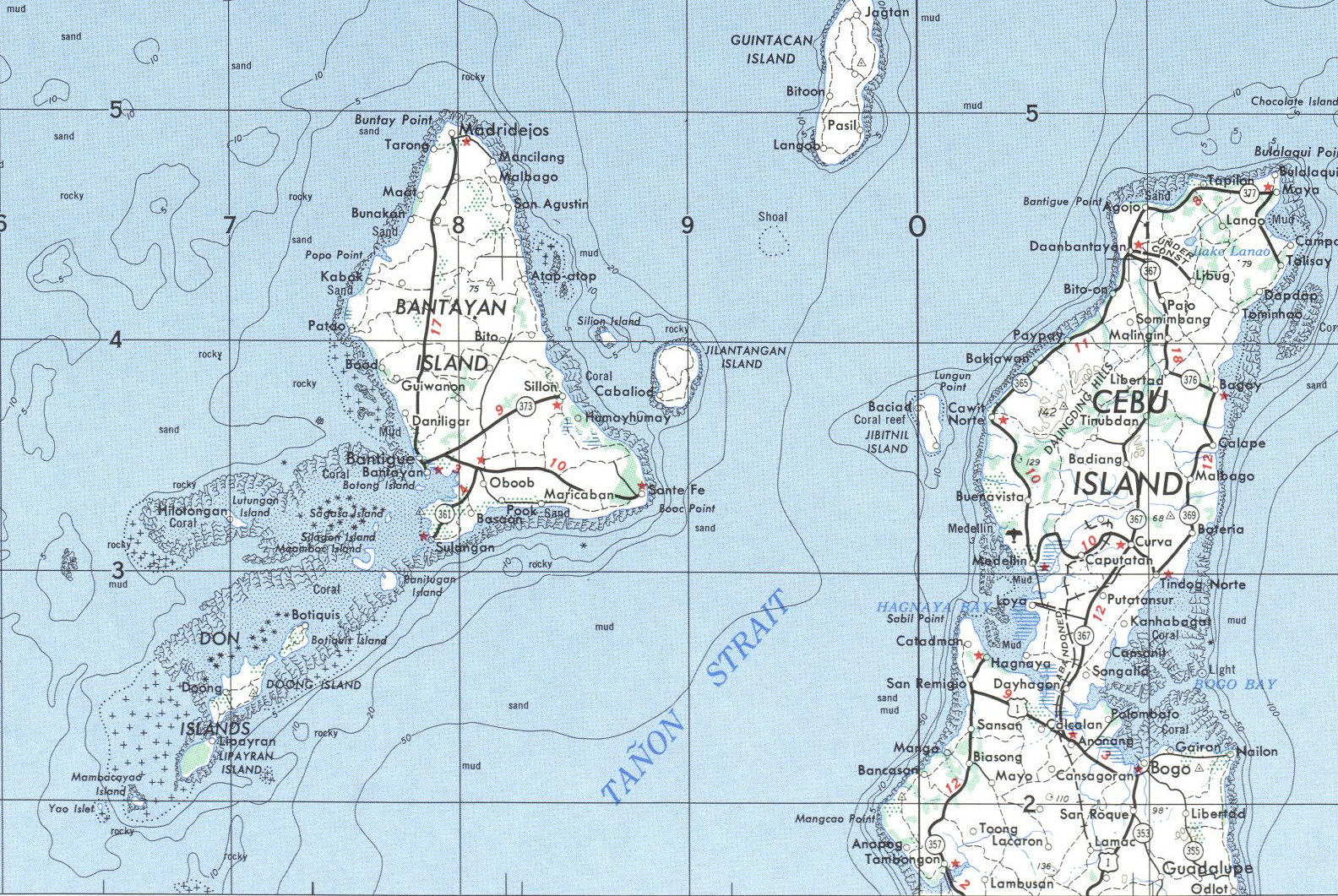
- Location within Bantayan Island
- Coordinates: 11°13′00″N 123°47′30″E

Area
  - Estimate: 25 ha (62 acres)
- Area estimated from satellite photograph

Silion (also known as Virgin Island, Hilantagaan Diot or Pulo Diyot) is a small island in the municipality of Santa Fe in the Central Visayas region of the Philippines.
