= Kris Tiffany Janson =

Filipino beauty pageant titleholder

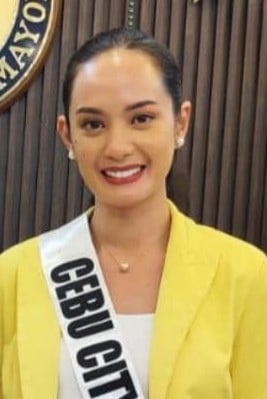
- Janson in 2024
- Born: Kris Tiffany Maslog Janson; December 21, 1989 (age 36)
- Education: De La Salle University (BS); Sacred Heart School - Ateneo de Cebu
- Beauty pageant titleholder
- Title: Binibining Pilipinas Intercontinental 2014
- Major competitions: Binibining Pilipinas 2014; (Winner - Binibining Pilipinas Intercontinental 2014); (Best in National Costume); (Binibining Photogenic); Miss Intercontinental 2014; (2nd Runner-up); (Miss Asia and Oceania); (Miss Photogenic); Miss Universe Philippines 2024; (Top 10)

Kris Tiffany Maslog Janson (born December 21, 1989) is a Filipino beauty pageant titleholder who won Binibining Pilipinas Intercontinental 2014. She represented the Philippines at the Miss Intercontinental 2014and was second runner-up. She then later competed at Miss Universe Philippines 2024 after winning Miss Universe Philippines Cebu 2024, where she finished in the top 10.

== Early life ==
Janson was born on December 21, 1989. She attended the Sacred Heart School - Ateneo de Cebu, graduating in 2007. She then later pursued Accountancy from the De La Salle University.

== Pageantry ==
=== Miss Cebu 2009 ===
In 2009, Janson entered and won her first pageant, Miss Cebu 2009.

=== Binibining Pilipinas 2014 ===
Janson competed at the Binibining Pilipinas 2014 competition where she was crowned as the inaugural Binibining Pilipinas Intercontinental 2014 by Melanie Marquez. She was also awarded the Best in National Costume and Miss Photogenic award.

=== Miss Intercontinental 2014 ===
As Binibining Pilipinas Intercontinental 2014, Janson competed at the Miss Intercontinental 2014 competition in Magdeburg, Germany where she finished as second runner-up to Patraporn Wang of Thailand. She was also awarded the Miss Photogenic award and was tied with Wang for the Miss Asia and Oceania award.

=== Miss Universe Philippines Cebu 2024 ===
After 10 years of inactivity from pageantry, Janson competed and won the inaugural Miss Universe Philippines Cebu competition, representing Cebu City North.

=== Miss Universe Philippines 2024 ===
Janson represented Cebu at Miss Universe Philippines 2024. She finished as a top 10 semifinalist, where Chelsea Manalo of Bulacan won.

Awards and achievements
First	Binibining Pilipinas Intercontinental 2014; 2014	Succeeded by Christi McGarry (Nabua, Camarines Sur)
Preceded by Teresita Baccay (Cabanatuan, Nueva Ecija)	Binibining Pilipinas Best in National Costume; 2014	Succeeded by Winwyn Marquez (Parañaque)
Preceded by Mutya Datul (Santa Maria, Isabela)	Binibining Pilipinas Bb. Photogenic; 2014	Succeeded by Caneille Santos (Marilao, Bulacan)
First	Miss Universe Philippines Cebu; 2024	Succeeded by Gabbi Carballo (Cebu City)
