= N841 highway =

Secondary route in the Philippines

Route 841

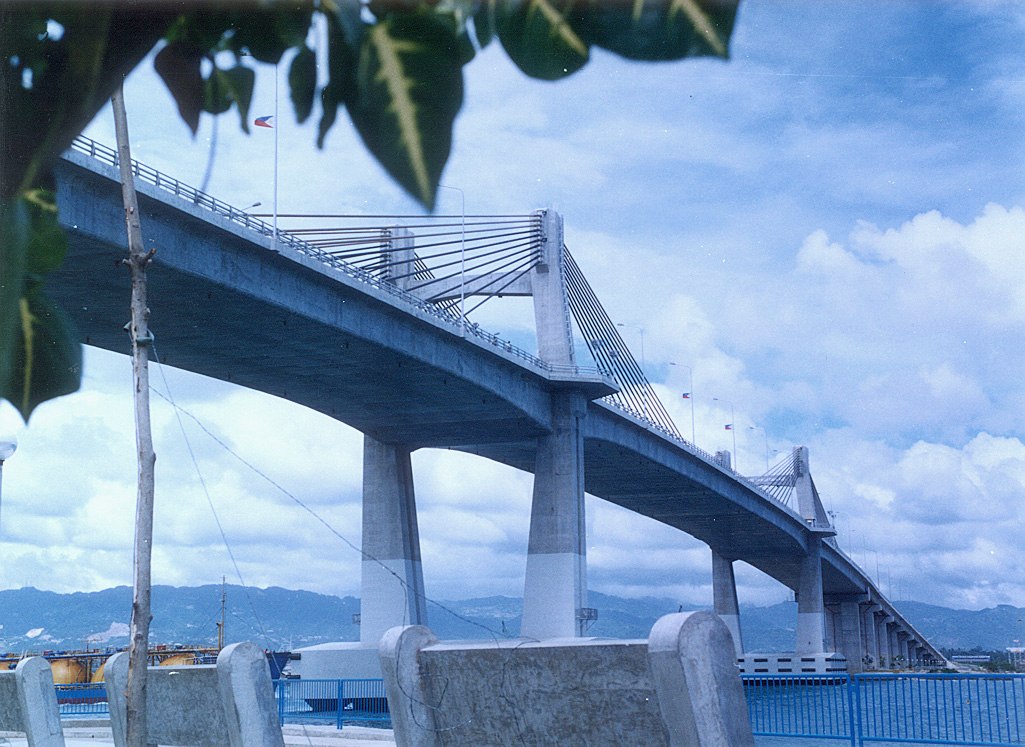
- Marcelo Fernan Bridge, a component of N841

Route information
- Maintained by Department of Public Works and Highways (DPWH)

Major junctions
- West end: N8 (Cebu North Road) in Mandaue
- N840 (D.M. Cortes Avenue) in Mandaue
- East end: N845 (Manuel Luis Quezon National Highway / Mactan Circumferential Road) in Lapu-Lapu

Location
- Country: Philippines
- Provinces: Cebu
- Major cities: Lapu-Lapu, Mandaue

Highway system
- Roads in the Philippines; Highways; Expressways; List
| ← N840 | → N845 |

National Route 841 (N841) is a 5-kilometer (3.1 mi), two-to-four lane national secondary route that forms part of the Philippine highway network, connecting the cities of Lapu-Lapu and Mandaue. It is carried by the Marcelo Fernan Bridge, constructed in 1996 and opened in 1999.

== History ==
The route was assigned the number N841 during the addition of National Routes in late 2016.

An underpass and road widening project for the route's road has been undertaken to ease the traffic congestion caused by the many vehicles traveling to and from Mactan–Cebu International Airport, but it has instead caused massive amounts of inconvenience as the project remains unfinished. Cebu Provincial Board member Glenn Soco has requested the Regional Development Council (RDC) to cancel the ongoing project in favor of a rotunda (roundabout).

== Route description ==
The route starts as United Nations Avenue in Mandaue. It crosses a major junction with D.M. Cortes Avenue (formerly Plaridel Street) (N840) After crossing the Marcelo Fernan Bridge over the Mactan Channel, the route continues along two exit viaducts, with both viaducts terminating as they both merge with the Manuel Luis Quezon National Highway/Mactan Circumferential Road (N845) in Lapu-Lapu City.
