= Gabbi Carballo =

Filipino doctor, model, and beauty pageant titleholder

Gabriella Mai Carballo
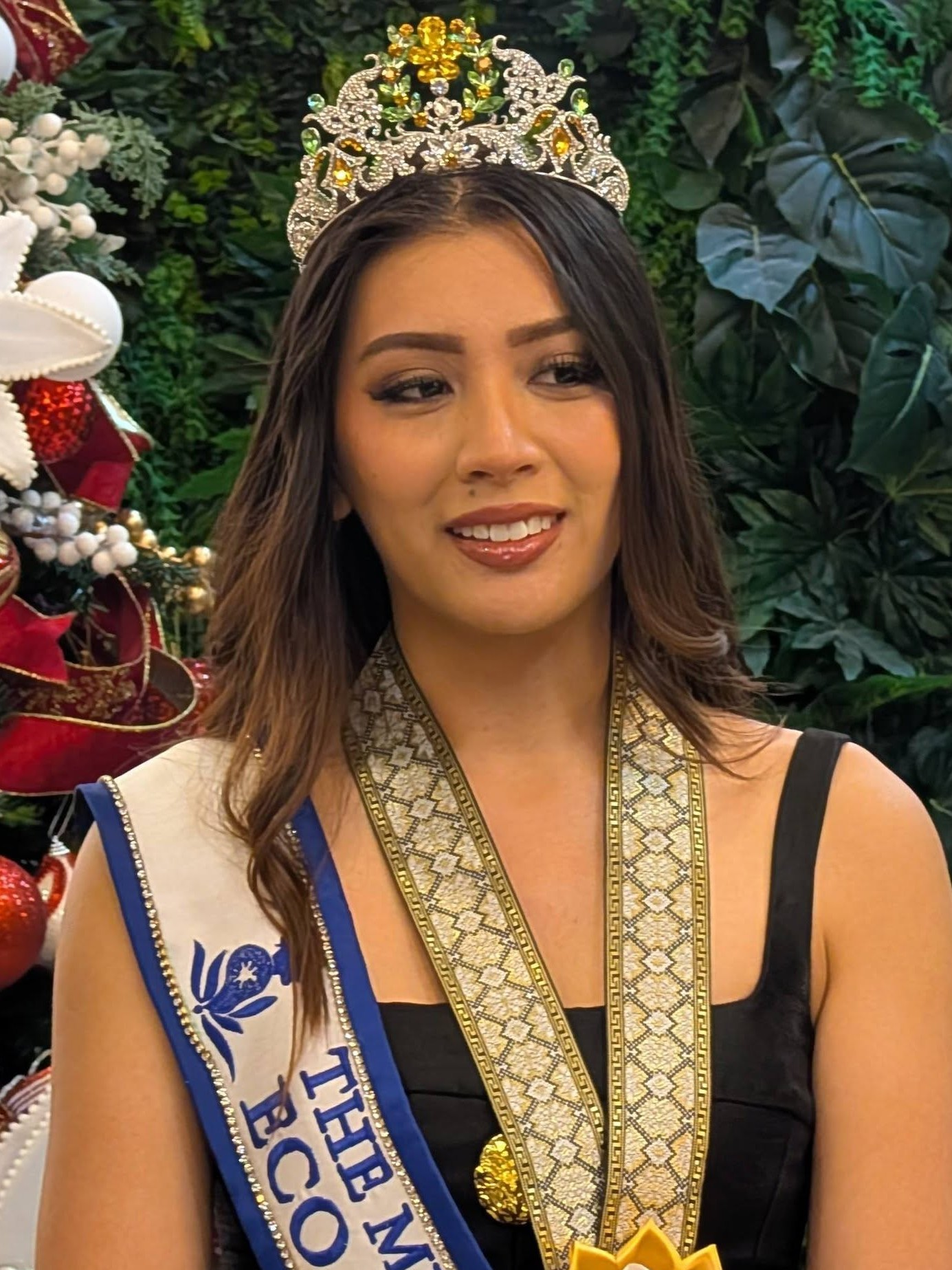
- Carballo in 2026
- Born: Gabriella Mai Carballo; September 20, 1999 (age 27); Miami, Florida, U.S.
- Education: Cebu Doctors' University (BS,MD)
- Beauty pageant titleholder
- Title: Miss Universe Philippines Cebu 2025; The Miss Philippines Eco International 2026
- Major competitions: Miss Universe Philippines Cebu 2025 (Winner); Miss Universe Philippines 2025 (Top 6); Miss Eco International 2026 (Top 21) (Miss Eco Top Model)

Gabriella Mai "Gabbi" Carballo is a Filipino doctor, model, and beauty pageant titleholder who was crowned The Miss Philippines Eco International 2026. She represented the Philippines at the Miss Eco International 2026 in Egypt and finished in the Top 21.

== Early life ==
Carballo was born on September 20, 1999, in Miami, Florida, to first generation Bisaya immigrants. She pursued her pre-medical degree in Nursing at Cebu Doctors' University, where she ranked eighth among the Batch 2020 graduates. She later completed her Doctor of Medicine degree at the same institution, graduating in 2024.

== Pageantry ==
=== Early Pageants ===
Carballo began competing in beauty pageants in 2017, when she was crowned Miss Valentine at the College of Nursing of Cebu Doctors' University. She then later competed and won Miss Mandaue in 2018 and Miss Cebu in 2022.

=== Miss Universe Philippines Cebu 2025 ===
Carballo competed at the Miss Universe Philippines Cebu 2025 pageant as Cebu City North's representative.

At the end of the competition, Carballo won the title, succeeding Kris Tiffany Janson. Her victory marked the first back-to-back win by the same locality since the inception of the pageant in 2024.

=== Miss Universe Philippines 2025 ===
As Miss Universe Philippines Cebu 2025, Carballo competed at the Miss Universe Philippines 2025 competition representing Cebu City where she finished as a top 6 semifinalist.

Following the coronation, Carballo was appointed as The Miss Philippines Eco International by The Miss Philippines, succeeding Miss Eco International 2024 Alexie Brooks.

=== Miss Eco International 2026 ===
As The Miss Philippines Eco International 2026, Carballo represented the Philippines at the Miss Eco International 2026 competition held in Egypt.

During the competition, Carballo placed second during the fitness day challenge held at the Alexandria Stadium. She also placed second during the talent competition held at the Rixos Montaza.

At the competition's carnival costume competition, Carballo sported a Sinulog inspired ensemble designed by Kenneth Malayka Yamas.

During the preliminary competition, Carballo paid tribute to the victims of the 2026 Binaliw landslide in Cebu City in her eco dress designed by Sarah Tutor, King Rosales, and MJ Jamio. During the evening gown segment, Carballo showcased a green evening gown designed by Philipp Tampus inspired by Licuala leaves, drawing inspiration from both the biodiversity and tropical spirit of the Philippines. She was then later awarded Miss Eco Top Model award during the preliminary competition.

During the competition's coronation night, Carballo showcased a national costume inspired by the Sierra Madre mountain range designed by Kenneth Malayka Yamas.

At the end of the competition, Carballo finished as a top 21 semifinalist.

== Advocacies and platforms ==
Carballo is an environmental sustainability and protection advocate. In 2018, she launched The Green Wave Cebu, an organization that focuses on environmental sanitation and public health in underserved communities.

Awards and achievements
Preceded by Alexie Brooks (Iloilo)	Miss Eco Philippines; 2026	Succeeded by Jenrose Javier (Sultan Kudarat)
