= Bai Hotel Cebu =

Hotel in Mandaue, Cebu, Philippines

- Interactive map of the Bai Hotel Cebu area

General information
- Status: Completed
- Location: Mandaue, Cebu, Philippines
- Coordinates: 10.324795813071308°N 123.936734972525°E
- Opening: September 27, 2017
- Management: Bai Global Properties Group

Technical details
- Floor count: 23
- Grounds: 69,000 m^{2} (740,000 sq ft)

Other information
- Number of rooms: 668

Website
- www.baihotels.com

Bai Hotel Cebu (stylized as bai Hotel Cebu) is a 668-room capacity hotel in Mandaue, Cebu. It is the largest hotel in Visayas by room capacity.

== History ==
The hotel started operations after its soft opening on September 27, 2017. By October 2018, all of its 668 rooms were ready and the grand opening for the hotel was held on November 23 of the same year.

== Facilities ==
Bai Hotel Cebu occupies a lot spanning 69,000 square meters (740,000 sq ft) and has 668 room sorted under ten classifications. The hotel building itself is 23-storeys high. It also hosts the Lapu Lapu Ballroom, an events venue. The Bureau of Fire Protection installed a 360-degree CCTV camera on the hotel rooftop to detect smoke from fire incidents in Mandaue.

== Management ==
Bai Global Properties Group manages Bai Hotel Cebu. The hotel is a member of WorldHotels, an international group of independent hotels, since April 9, 2016.
