= Santa Fe, Cebu =

Municipality in Cebu, Philippines

Santa Fe
- Municipality
- Municipality of Santa Fe
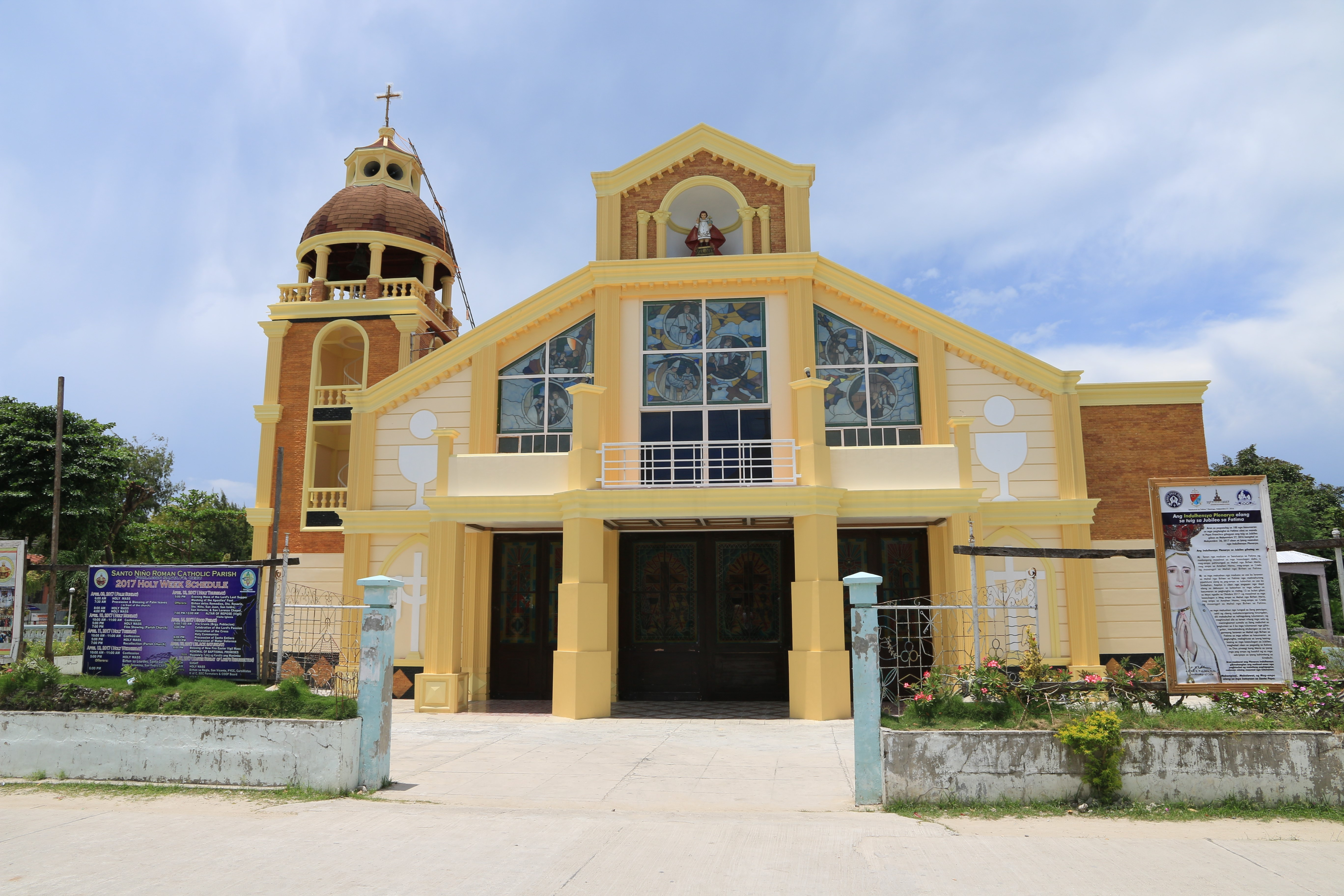
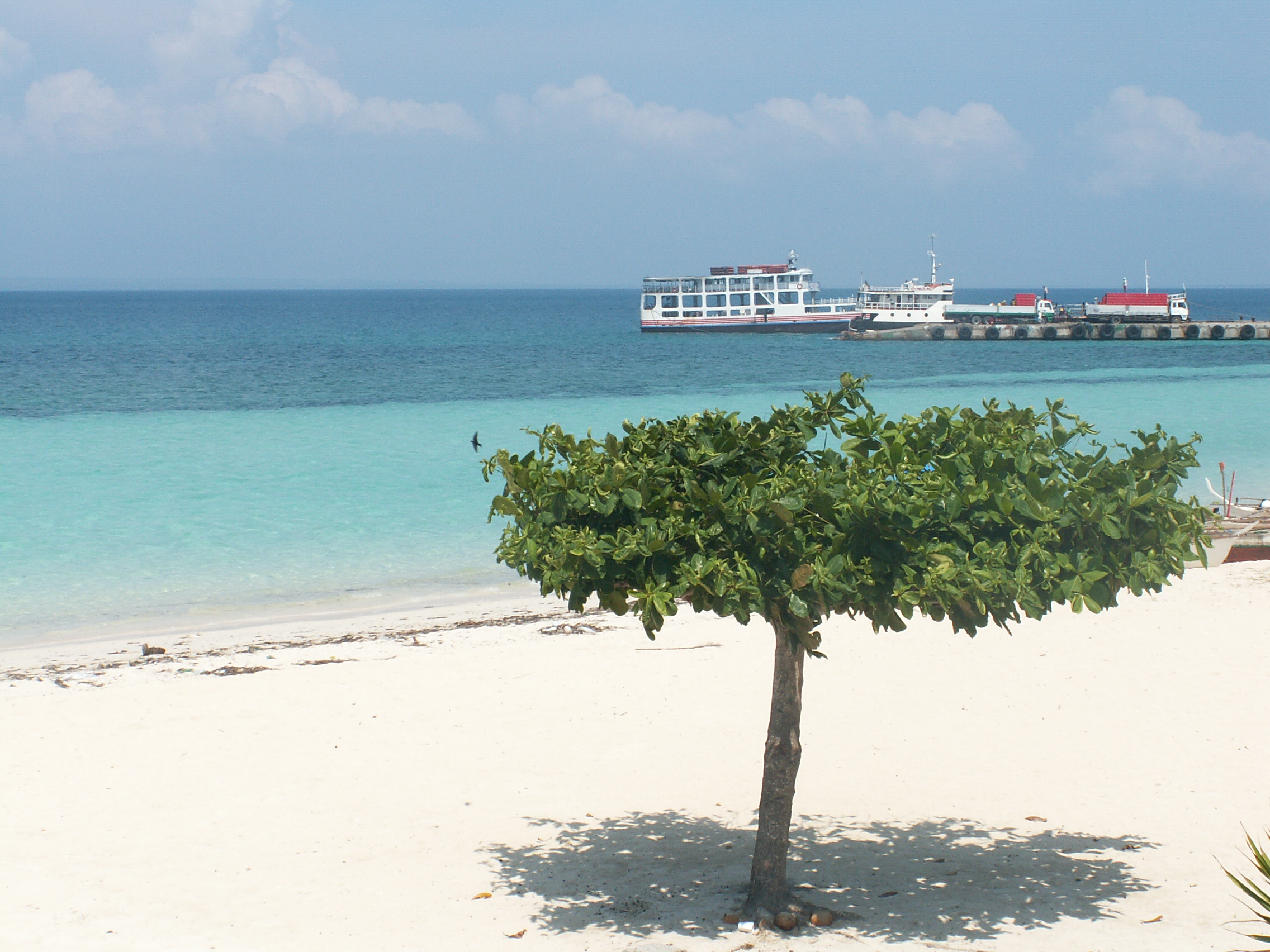
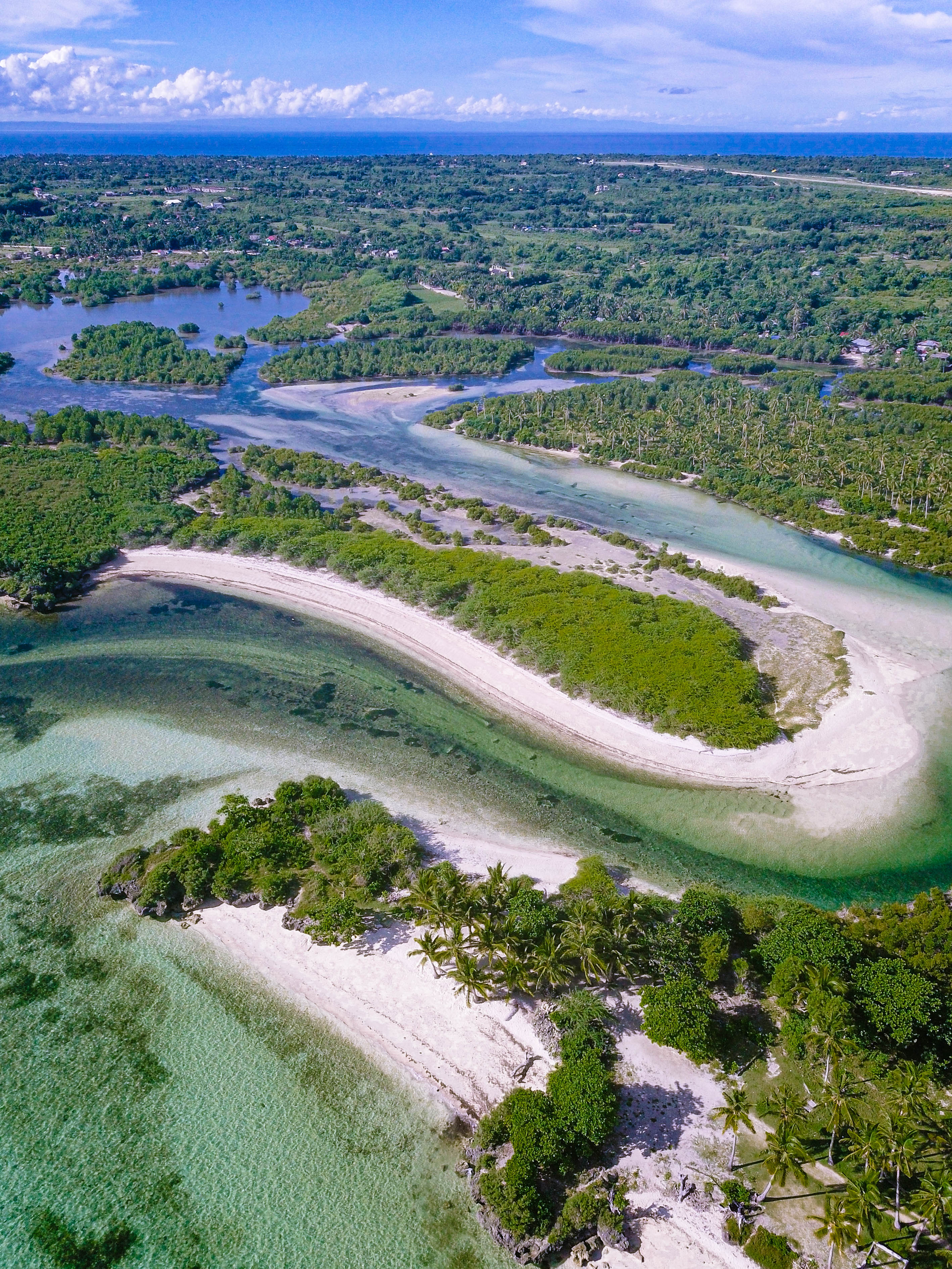
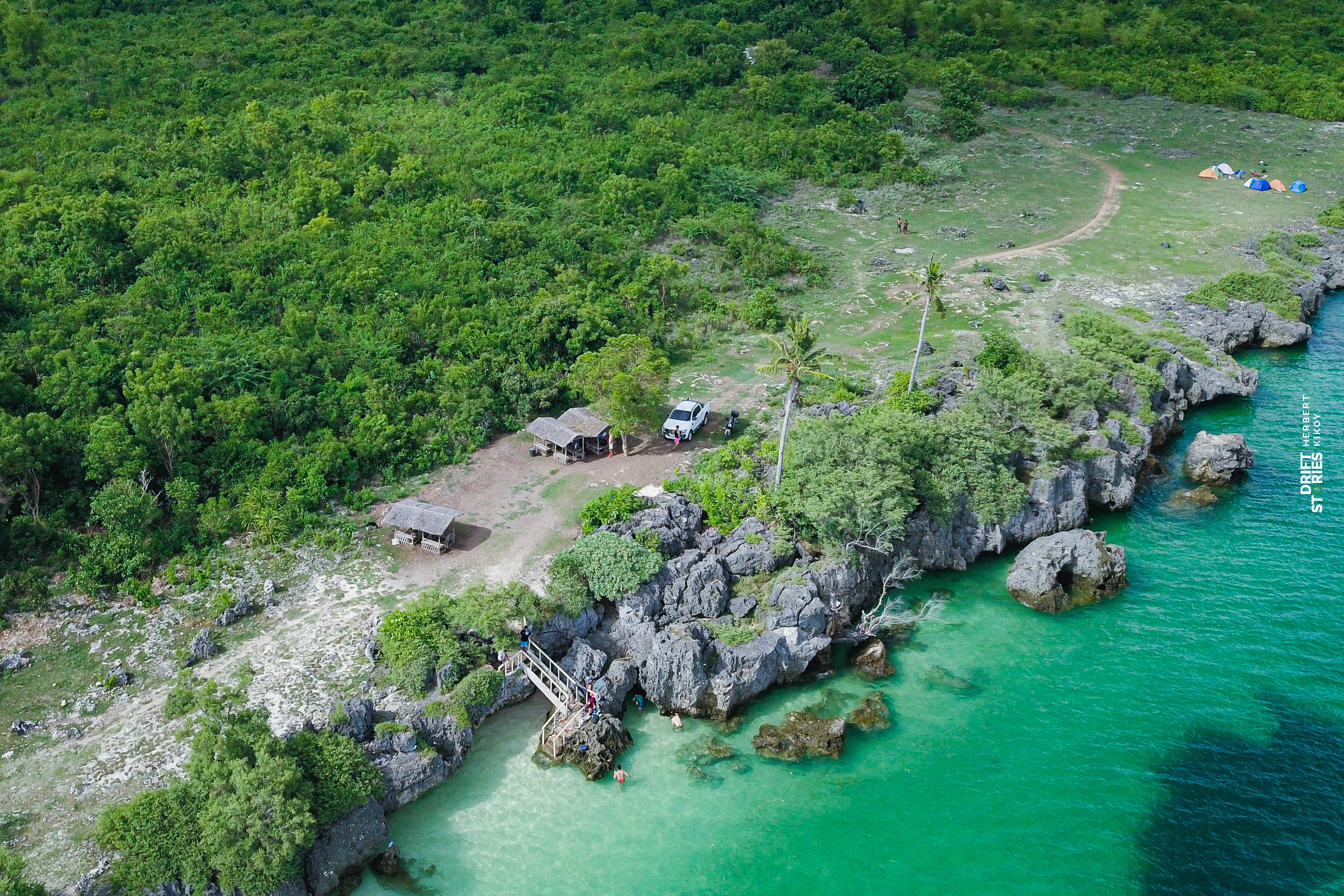
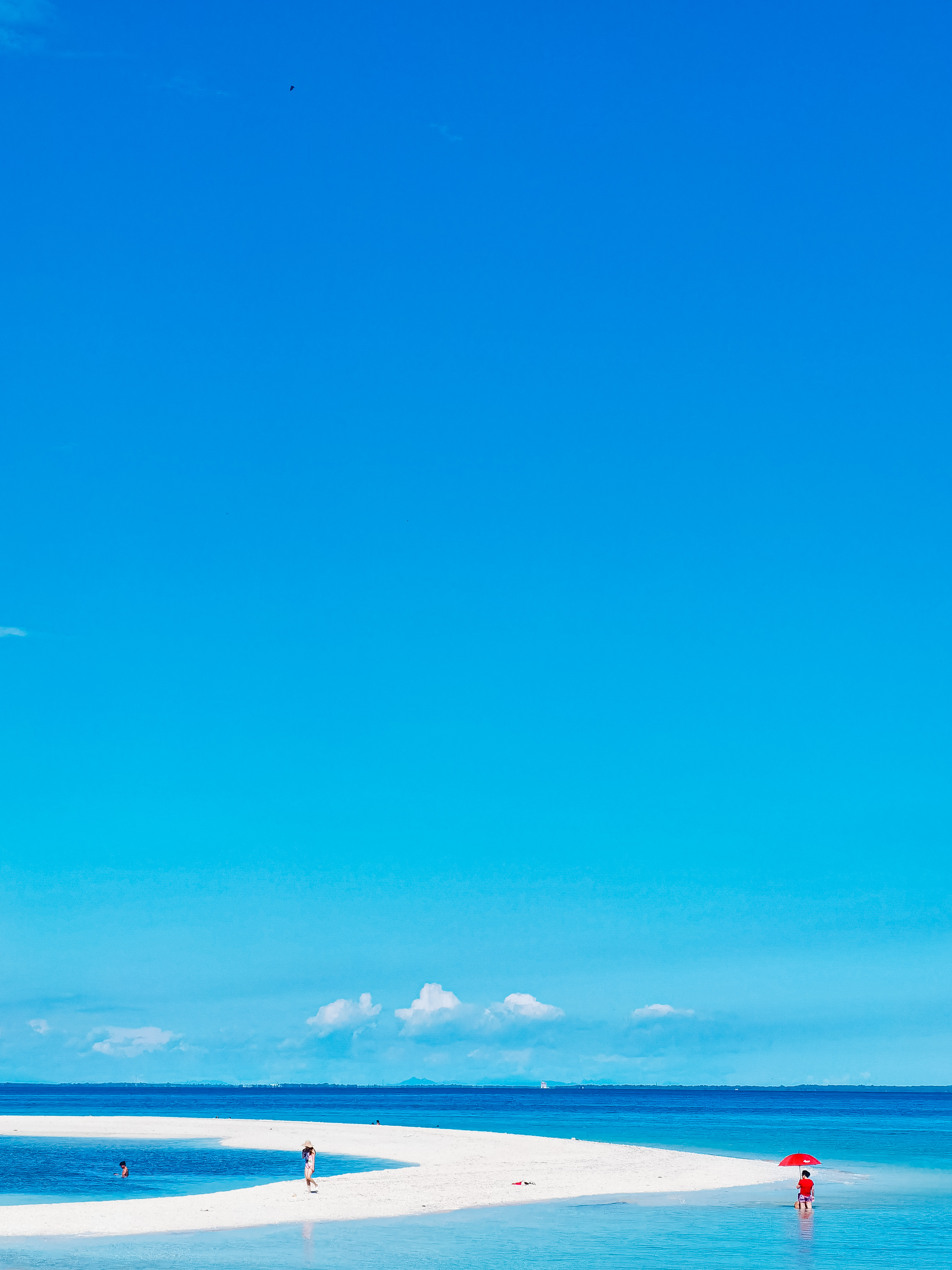
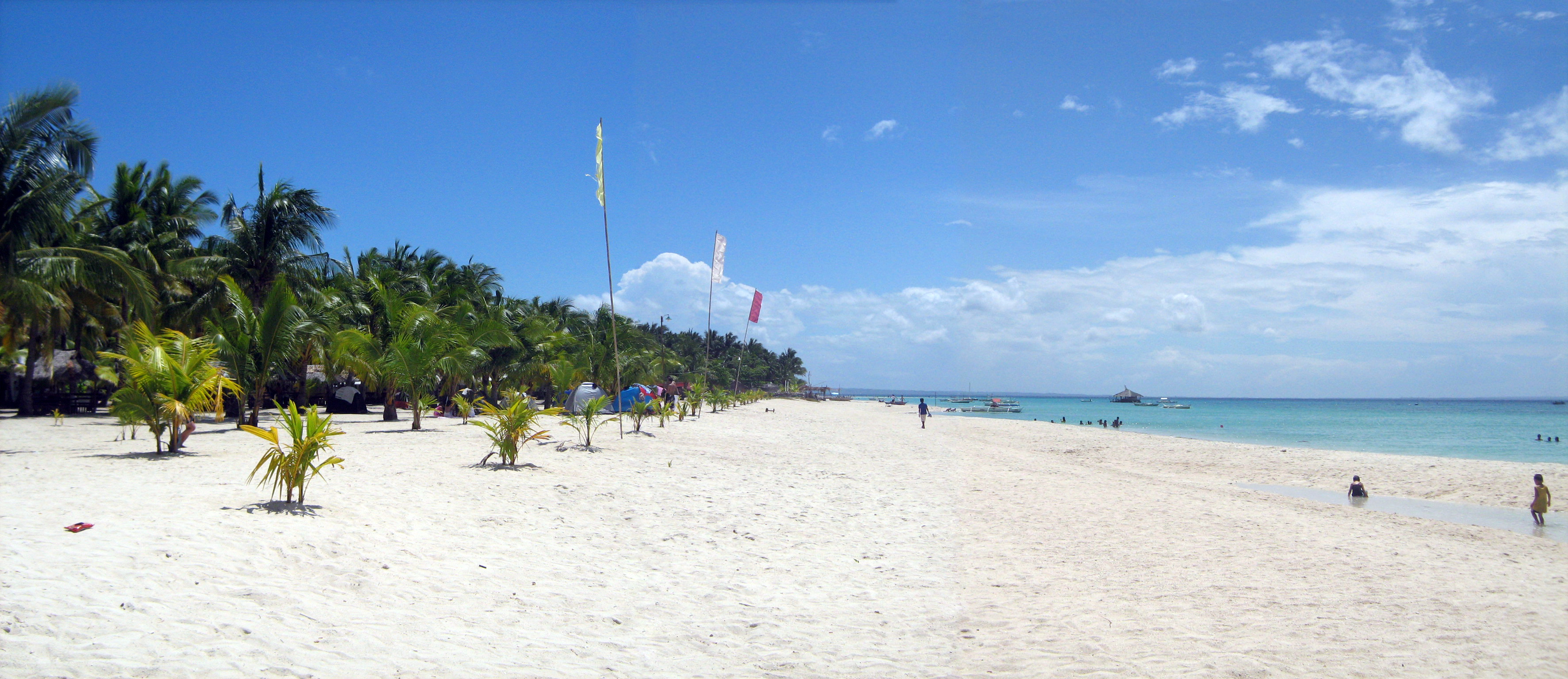
- Left to right, from the top: Sto. Niño Roman Catholic Parish Church, Santa Fe port, Balidbid Lagoon, Maricaban Coastline, Kota Sandbar, and Sugar Beach.

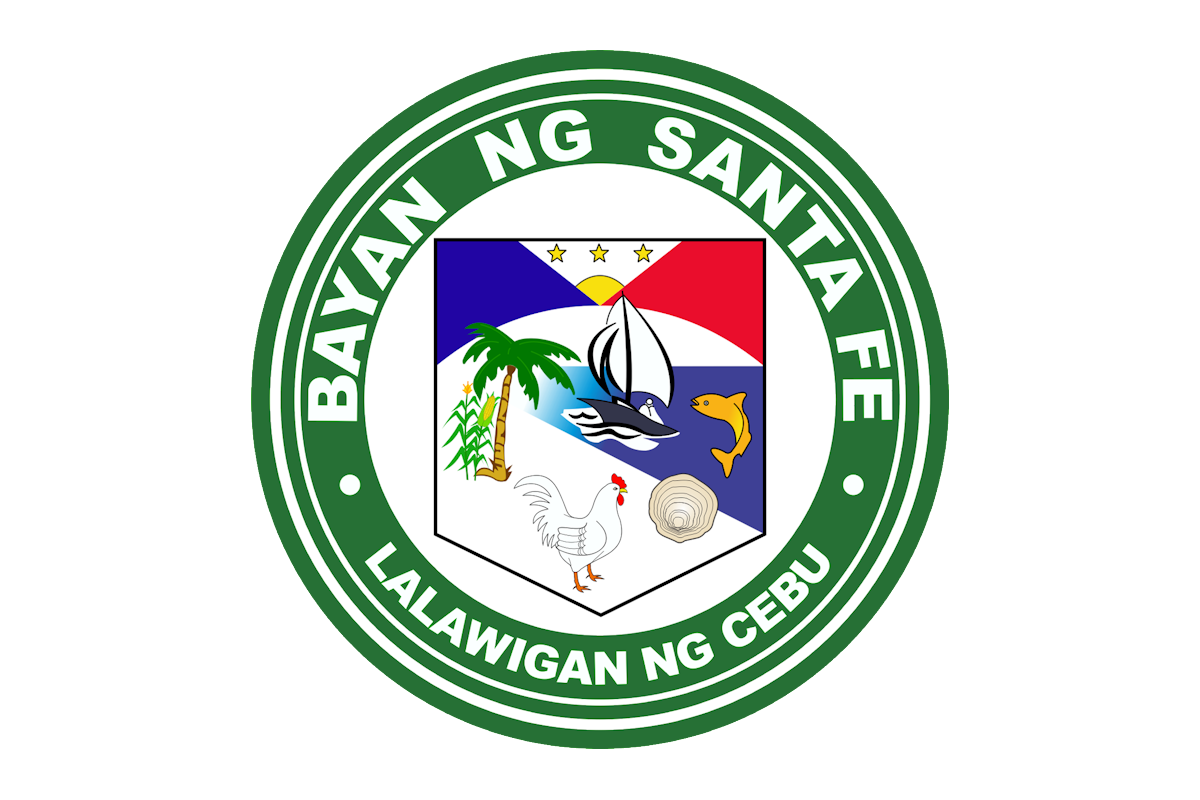
- Flag Seal

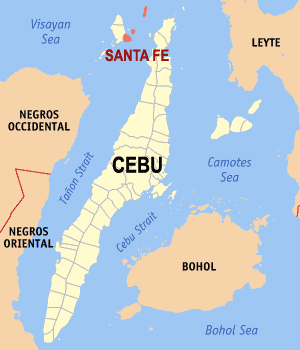
- Map of Cebu with Santa Fe highlighted
- Interactive map of Santa Fe
- Location within the Philippines
- Coordinates: 11°09′N 123°48′E
- Country: Philippines
- Region: Central Visayas
- Province: Cebu
- District: 4th district
- Barangays: 10 (see Barangays)

Government
  - Type: Sangguniang Bayan
  - Mayor: Ithamar P. Espinosa (1Cebu)
  - Vice Mayor: Mary Greleigh P. Cabrera (1Cebu)
  - Representative: Sun J. Shimura (PMP)
  - Municipal Council: Members: Ryan James G. Fariolen; James Philip P. Lao; Junrel G. Bataycan; Dindo G. Zaspa; Joan Gay P. Nepangue; Francis Kelvin E. Mondejar; Rosalinda Z. Espinosa; Wilfredo E. Batobalonos Sr.
  - Electorate: 22,646 voters (2025)

Area
  - Total: 28.05 km^{2} (10.83 sq mi)
- Elevation: 3.0 m (9.8 ft)
- Highest elevation: 38 m (125 ft)
- Lowest elevation: 0 m (0 ft)

Population (2024 census)
  - Total: 34,834
  - Density: 1,242/km^{2} (3,216/sq mi)
  - Households: 8,241

Economy
  - Income class: 3rd municipal income class
  - Poverty incidence: 27.05% (2023)
  - Revenue: ₱ 183.9 million (2024)
  - Assets: ₱ 465.5 million (2024)
  - Expenditure: ₱ 176.7 million (2024)
  - Liabilities: ₱ 67.16 million (2024)

Service provider
  - Electricity: Bantayan Island Electric Cooperative (BANELCO)
- Time zone: UTC+8 (PST)
- ZIP code: 6047
- PSGC: 072244000
- IDD : area code: +63 (0)32
- Native languages: Cebuano; Filipino; Waray

Santa Fe, officially the Municipality of Santa Fe (Cebuano: Lungsod sa Santa Fe; Tagalog: Bayan ng Santa Fe), is a municipality in the province of Cebu, Philippines. According to the 2024 census, it has a population of 34,834 people.

Because the island's airport and principal ferry port are both located within the municipality, Santa Fe is considered the gateway to Bantayan and its islands.

== Geography ==
The municipality's territory occupies the southeastern portion of Bantayan Island (marching with the municipality of Bantayan), together with the islands of Guintacan (or Kinatarkan), Hilantagaan and Hilantagaan Diot (or Silion). Santa Fe is bordered to the north by the town of Bantayan, to the west also by Bantayan, to the east is the town of Medellin and to the south is the Tañon Strait.

=== Barangays ===
Santa Fe is politically subdivided into 10 barangays. Each barangay consists of puroks and some have sitios.

PSGC	Barangay	Population			±% p.a.	
		2024		2010		
072244009	Balidbid	5.3%	1,853	1,592	▴	1.06%
072244002	Hagdan	10.0%	3,486	3,545	▾	−0.12%
072244003	Hilantagaan	10.7%	3,726	3,651	▴	0.14%
072244004	Kinatarkan	4.8%	1,667	1,763	▾	−0.39%
072244005	Langub	5.9%	2,055	2,082	▾	−0.09%
072244006	Maricaban	9.4%	3,286	2,999	▴	0.64%
072244007	Okoy	11.2%	3,916	3,532	▴	0.72%
072244008	Poblacion	7.1%	2,458	2,345	▴	0.33%
072244010	Pooc	9.4%	3,280	2,883	▴	0.90%
072244011	Talisay	8.3%	2,876	2,878	▾	0.00%
	Total		34,834	27,270	▴	1.71%

=== Climate ===
Climate data for Santa Fe, Cebu
Month	Jan	Feb	Mar	Apr	May	Jun	Jul	Aug	Sep	Oct	Nov	Dec	Year
Mean daily maximum °C (°F)	28 (82)	29 (84)	30 (86)	31 (88)	31 (88)	30 (86)	30 (86)	30 (86)	30 (86)	29 (84)	29 (84)	28 (82)	30 (85)
Mean daily minimum °C (°F)	23 (73)	23 (73)	23 (73)	24 (75)	25 (77)	25 (77)	25 (77)	25 (77)	25 (77)	25 (77)	24 (75)	23 (73)	24 (75)
Average precipitation mm (inches)	70 (2.8)	49 (1.9)	62 (2.4)	78 (3.1)	138 (5.4)	201 (7.9)	192 (7.6)	185 (7.3)	192 (7.6)	205 (8.1)	156 (6.1)	111 (4.4)	1,639 (64.6)
Average rainy days	13.4	10.6	13.1	14.5	24.2	27.9	28.4	27.7	27.1	27.4	22.5	15.9	252.7
Source: Meteoblue

== Demographics ==
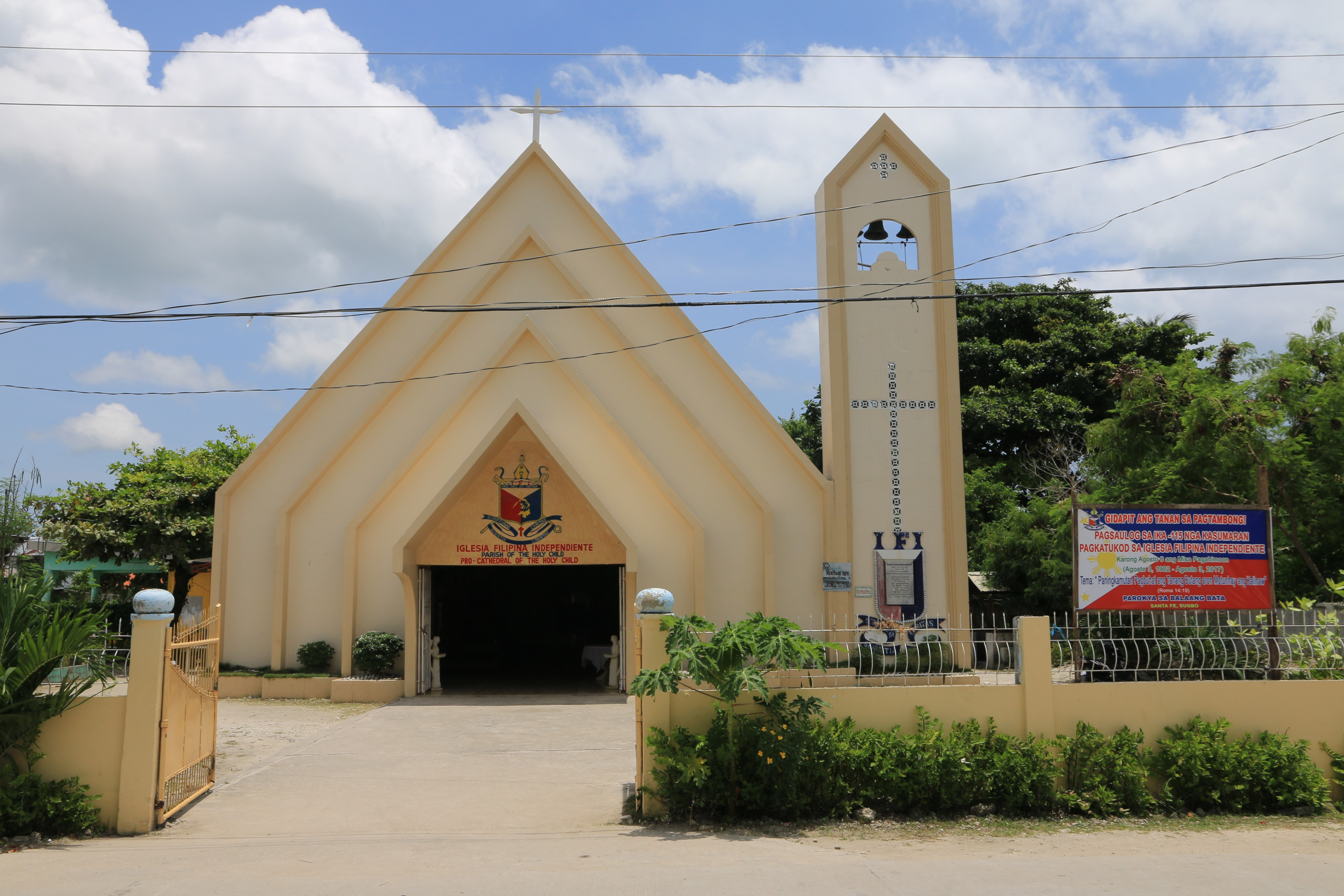
The Pro-Cathedral of the Holy Child of the Iglesia Filipina Independiente (Philippine Independent Church) in Santa Fe, Cebu.

Population census of Santa Fe

Year	Pop.	±% p.a.
1903	4,025	—
1918	5,781	+2.44%
1939	7,836	+1.46%
1948	10,311	+3.10%
1960	11,542	+0.94%
1970	13,096	+1.27%

Year	Pop.	±% p.a.
1975	15,501	+3.44%
1980	15,787	+0.37%
1990	20,838	+2.82%
1995	21,720	+0.78%
2000	22,956	+1.19%
2007	26,826	+2.17%

Year	Pop.	±% p.a.
2010	27,270	+0.60%
2015	28,603	+0.91%
2020	34,471	+4.01%
2024	34,834	+0.25%

Source: Philippine Statistics Authority

=== Religion ===
The two predominant religions in the municipality are the Roman Catholic Church and the Iglesia Filipina Independiente (Philippine Independent Church).

== Economy ==
Poverty incidence of Santa Fe (%)

Source: Philippine Statistics Authority

Although there is some small-scale industry, the municipality's principal source of income is fishing and agriculture, and from holidaymakers who come in large numbers, most notably during Holy Week, to enjoy the particularly fine white sand and uncrowded beaches.

== Transport ==
Bantayan Airport, serving the whole Bantayan Island, is located in Santa Fe. Air Juan operates scheduled flights between Mactan Airport three days a week. The town can also be reached by ferry from Hagnaya Wharf in San Remigio, Cebu.

In August 2024, the Port of Cebu announced the construction of a PHP500 million Santa Fe Port, featuring a finger wharf, passenger terminal and marina for international cruise ships. The four phases project also includes causeway's reinforced concrete deck, and berthing areas for ferries and roll-on/roll-off vessels.

== Gallery ==
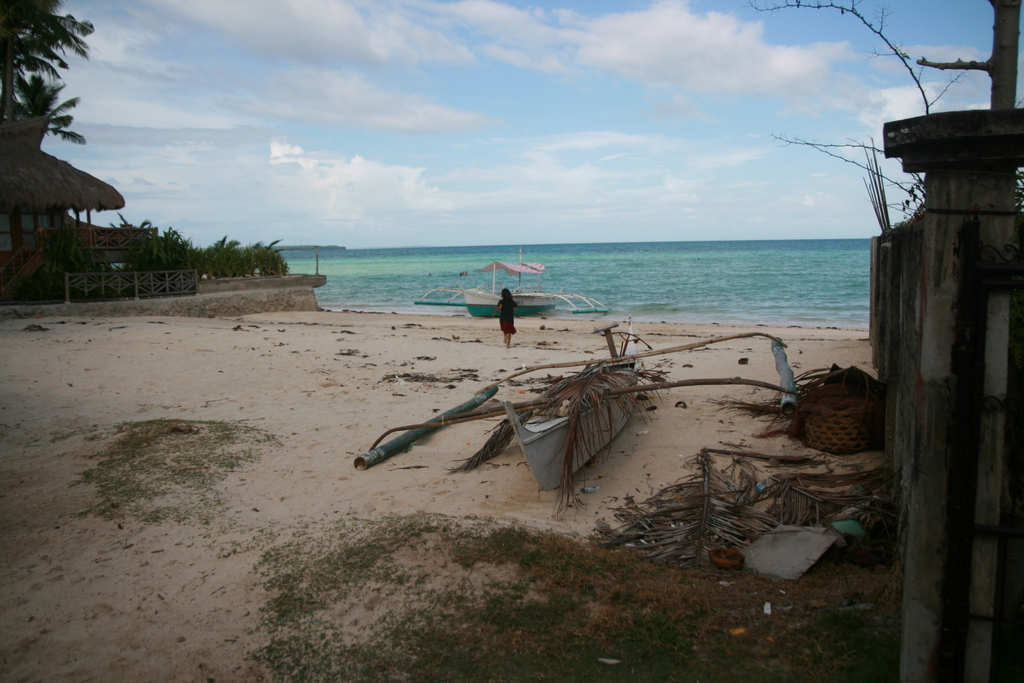
Boat beached in Santa Fe

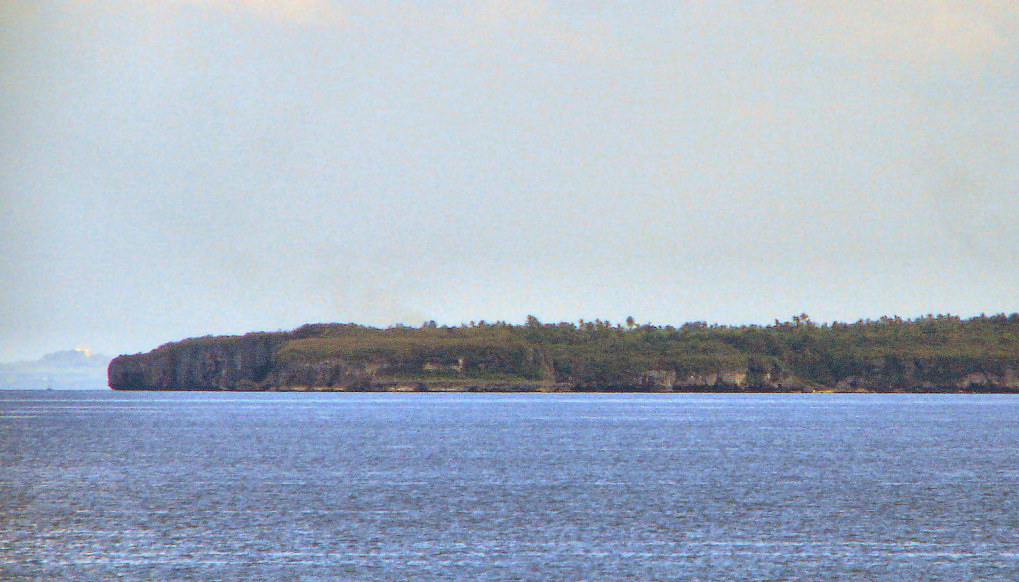
Guintacan Island; the 3 barangays of Hagdan, Kinatarkan and Langub are located on this island.

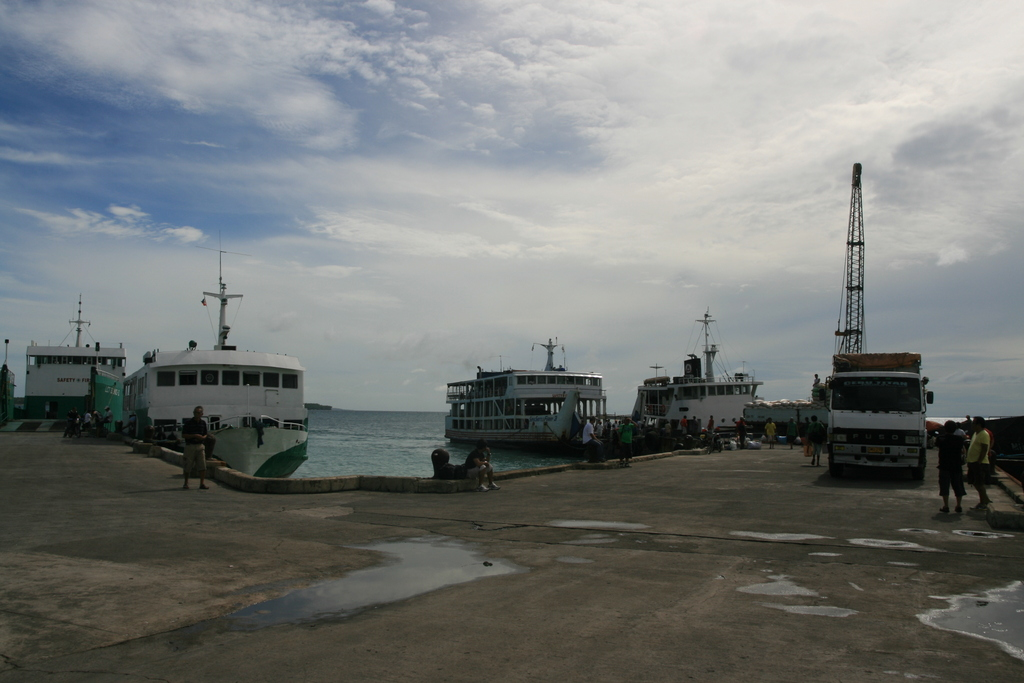
Ferry pier, Santa Fe

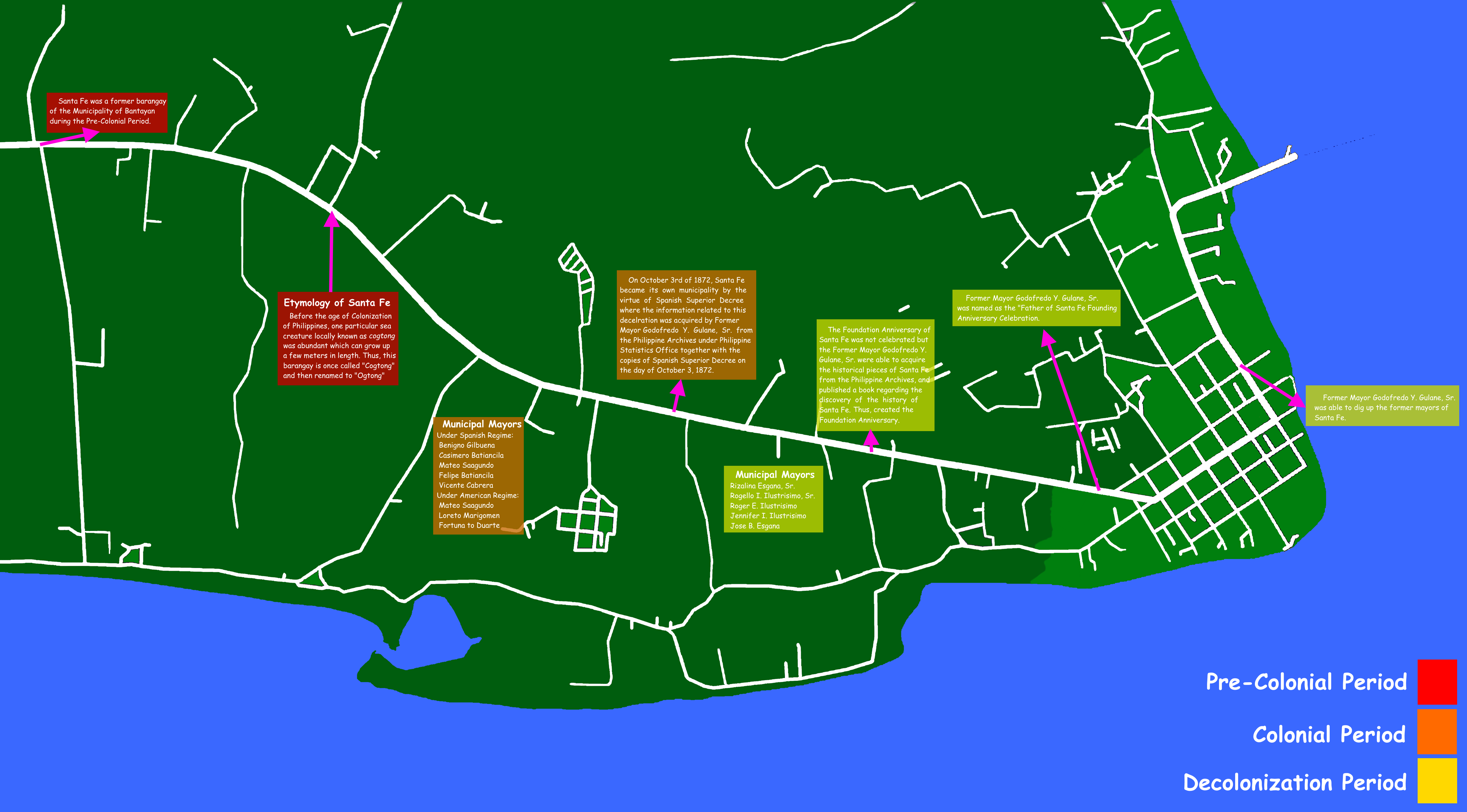
Santa Fe Founding Anniversary
