= Panay Railways =

Philippine government corporation

Panay Railways Incorporated
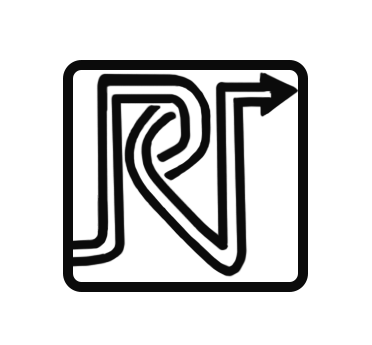

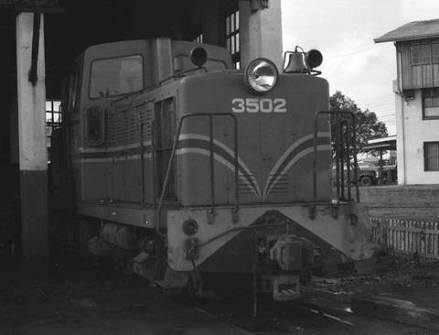
- JNR Class DD13 in 1970s, after being handed over to Panay Railways
- Formerly: Philippine Railway Company Incorporated
- Industry: Railway
- Founded: Hartford, Connecticut, USA (March 5, 1906)
- Headquarters: Huervana Street, La Paz, Iloilo City, Philippines
- Area served: Panay
- Key people: Averill Amor, CEO; Neil Gabriel Bonto, Project Manager
- Total assets: ₱307,014,042.00 (2024)
- Total equity: ₱289,848,392.00 (2024)
- Owner: Government of the Philippines
- Number of employees: 12
- Parent: Philippine Veterans Investment Development Corporation

Panay Railways, Inc. is a government-owned and controlled corporation of the Philippines that formerly operated railway systems on the islands of Panay and Cebu. It is headquartered in La Paz, Iloilo City, and is a subsidiary of Phividec Railways, Inc. under the Philippine Veterans Investment Development Corporation (PHIVIDEC). While Panay Railways currently does not operate any trains, it leases its property, and the generated revenue is utilized to cover personnel and administrative costs associated with maintaining its assets.

The company has been owned in succession by the Rehabilitation Finance Corporation which became the Development Bank of the Philippines (1945–74), and then it was sold to the PHIVIDEC (1974–79). In 1979, management and operations were transferred to the Philippine Sugar Commission (PHILSUCOM) which changed the company's name to the current Panay Railways, Inc. On September 26, 1995, PHIVIDEC re-acquired ownership of Panay Railways from the Sugar Regulatory Administration, PHILSUCOM's successor.

There have been feasibility studies and proposals to revive the railways, including discussions about opening the company to foreign ownership to facilitate the reconstruction of its former train lines. The reconstruction is planned to proceed in four phases: the first phase will cover the route from Iloilo City to Roxas City, the second phase will extend from Roxas City to Caticlan (Boracay) in Malay, Aklan, the third phase will extend from Caticlan to San Jose, Antique, and the fourth phase will complete the loop back to Iloilo City.

== History ==
In December 1905, a syndicate composed of William Salomon and Company, International Banking Corporation, Heidelbach, Ickelheimer and Company, Cornelius Vanderbilt III, Charles M. Swift, H. R. Wilson, and J. G. White and Company was the sole bidder for the right to construct railroads on Cebu, Panay and Negros. In 1906, the syndicate was awarded the concession and the Philippine Railway Company Inc. was incorporated in the state of Connecticut, United States on March 5, 1906.

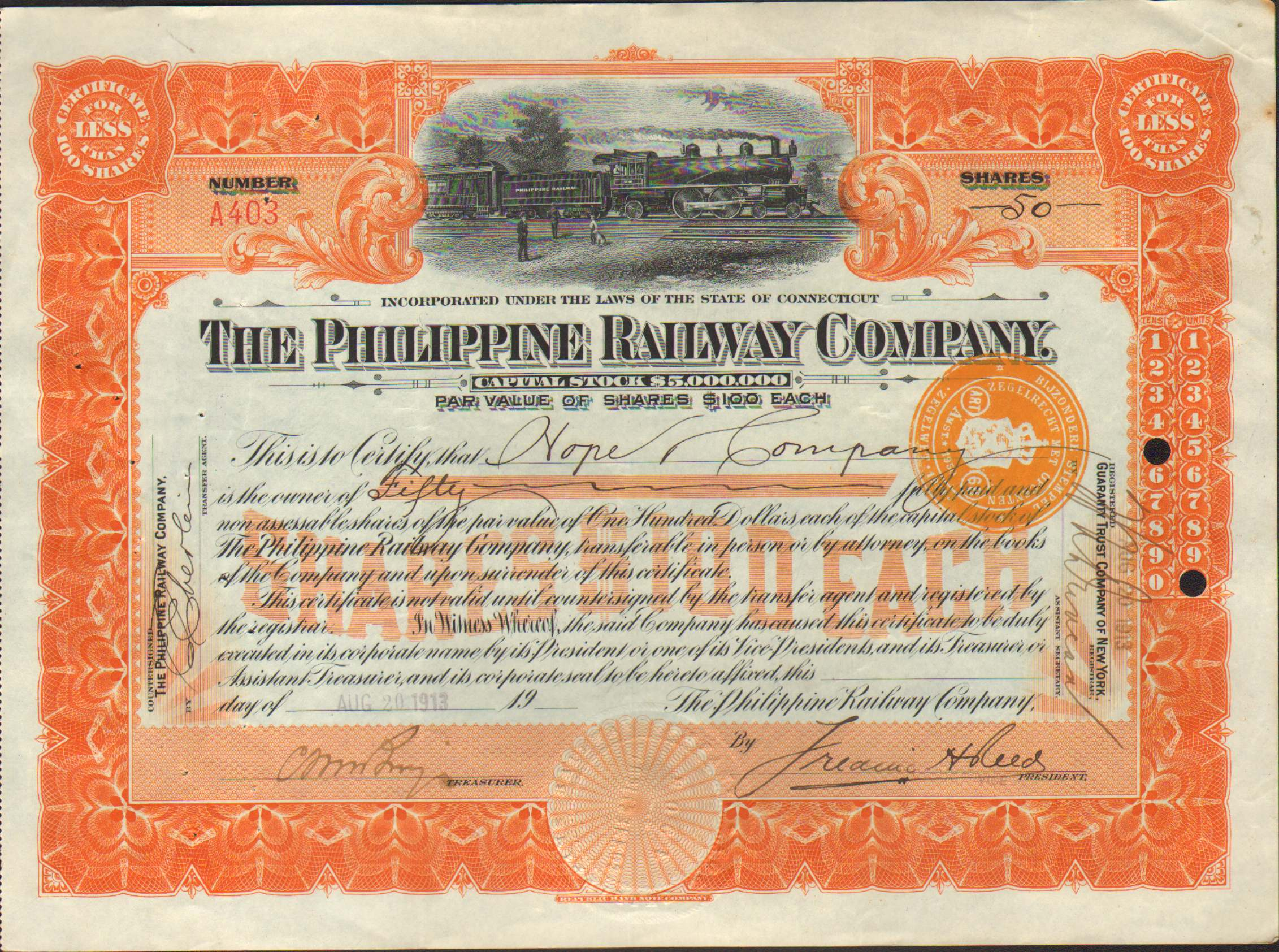

On May 28, 1906, the Philippine government formally passed an act granting the company the concession.

The company became part of a "Manila syndicate", a collection of Philippine infrastructure companies including the Manila Electric Railway and Light Company, the Manila Construction Company, and the Manila Suburban Railways Company. Later the Philippine Railways Construction Company was added.

Construction began on a railroad from Iloilo City to Roxas City in Capiz with crews working from both cities and meeting in the middle in 1907. Crews working from the north and south met at the railway track's highest elevation in a flag stop near Passi's border with Dumarao, later called Summit. Operations began immediately upon completion.

In 1937, after three decades of operations, the railroad had not yet earned a profit.

In 1939, three individuals were convicted in a fraud scheme involving bonds from the then Philippine Railway Company. In 1937, bonds in the "sick, sugary-hauling road" were selling for about US$11 and were about to mature apparently worthless. The price of the bonds then rose rapidly to $31 a share because of rumors that the Philippine Commonwealth would buy them for $65. Philippine Commonwealth President Manuel Quezon denied the rumor and the bonds crashed. The U.S. Securities and Exchange Commission launched an investigation and William P. Buckner Jr. and William J. Gillespie, members of the bondholders protective committee, were convicted of mail fraud and conspiracy. Also convicted of a lesser charge was Filipino Felipe Abreu Buencamino, whip of the Philippine Assembly and confidant of President Quezon, who allegedly received $50,000 (equivalent to $1,119,792 in 2025) to cooperate with the plan.

In 1974, then-President Ferdinand Marcos entrusted its ownership, management and operations to Philippine Veterans Investment Development Corporation (PHIVIDEC) under DBP BR No. 3463, s. of 1974 as amended by BR No. 3593, s. of 1974. In consideration of DBP's transfer of the railway to PHIVIDEC and pursuant to a Deed of Assignment dated December 12, 1974, PHIVIDEC issued to DBP shares of stocks worth ₱5 million, PHIVIDEC spun off its transport division and organized a subsidiary corporation, Phividec Railways, Inc. In 1976, DBP extended to Phividec Railways, Inc. a ₱5.500 million Industrial Loan and a ₱4.000 million Guaranty Loan for the rehabilitation of the railroad tracks and acquisition of additional rolling stocks, as well as, major equipment. As security for the subject loan accommodation, Phividec Railways, Inc. mortgaged some of its assets in favor of DBP. On March 8, 1977, Phividec Railways, Inc. mortgaged in favor of DBP certain machinery and equipment located in Iloilo City and parcels of land.

On May 12, 1979, then-President Marcos approved the sale of PHIVIDEC's share in the Phividec Railways, Inc. to the Philippine Sugar Commission (PHILSUCOM). This covered the conversion of its ₱45 million DBP loan into equity either in the form of cumulative preferred shares or common shares with defined representation. Pursuant thereto, an agreement to sell 4,200,000 PHIVIDEC shares was entered into on May 25, 1979 by PHIVIDEC and PHILSUCOM, subject among others, the assumption by the latter of the obligations of the former with DBP and to guarantee the payment of such financial accommodations. Thereafter, Phividec Railways, Inc. changed its corporate name to Panay Railways, Incorporated (PRI).

Per Memorandum of Agreement among DBP, PHILSUCOM and PRI dated September 12, 1979, obligations with DPB, then amounting to ₱ 40 million will be automatically converted into 10% non-cumulative convertible preferred shares of PRI. The shares are redeemable commencing on the sixth (6th) year from date of issue and every year thereafter, such that the total preferred shares issued to DBP shall be fully redeemed on the fifteenth (15th) anniversary of the date of issue. Redemption may be accelerated at the option of PRI.

In compliance, thereto, PRI issued stock certificates aggregating to ₱53.727 million on various dates, the latest of which was issued on June 19, 1984. Despite the prohibition contained in the aforementioned Deed of Undertaking, PRI obtained a loan from the Traders Royal Bank (TRB) in the amount of ₱20.000 million and executed a Real Estate Mortgage on April 20, 1982. In July 1985, PRI ceased operation due to mounting losses and cash flow problems.

In 1989, freight operations ceased.

In May 1986, by virtue of Executive Order No. 18, then-President Corazon Aquino abolished the PHILSUCOM and created the Sugar Regulatory Administration (SRA) which assumed trusteeship of assets and records of PRI. By virtue of the Deed of Transfer dated February 27, 1987 executed by DBP pursuant to Presidential Proclamation No. 50 as amended and by Administrative Order No. 14, the National Government (NG) was mandated to take title and possession of all shares of stocks of PRI.

Meanwhile, Traders Royal Bank (TRB) foreclosed the PRI mortgaged properties and these were sold at a sheriff’s auction on January 20, 1986. TRB was declared the highest bidder for the sum of ₱ 37.33 million and a Deed of Definite Sale in favor of TRB was executed on December 27, 1989. An Affidavit of Consolidation of Ownership was executed on the same day.

By virtue of the Deed of Transfer dated February 27, 1987 executed by DBP pursuant to Presidential Proclamation No. 50 as amended and by Administrative Order No. 14, the National Government was mandated to take title and possession of all shares of stocks of PRI.

A Trust Agreement (TA) constituted as trustee over the properties of PRI then, Asset Privatization Trust (APT) and later succeeded by the Privatization and Management Office (PMO).

During the meeting with then-President Benigno Aquino III on September 28, 2015, the abolition of PRI had already been approved in principle. However, pending the issuance of a formal document approving such abolition, and the subsequent revocation of its certificate of registration with the SEC, PRI must follow the pertinent provisions of the Corporation Code and the Labor Code with respect to the procedure in closing down a corporation and separating its employees. On February 15, 2016, a memorandum from Executive Secretary Paquito Ochoa Jr. to Chairman Cesar L. Villanueva of the Governance Commission for Government Owned or Controlled Corporations (GCG) on the subject of Abolition of PRI stated, among others, the 1) approval by the Office of the President through the Executive Secretary of the GCG’s recommendation to abolish PRI and 2) the creation of a Technical Working Group (TWG) composed of representatives from various government agencies to coordinate with the GCG to implement the activities of abolition. The PRI Board of Directors and Management continue to manage and maintain to preserve the assets of the PRI until further instructions from the GCG on the implementation of the abolition.

PRI has 11 regular employees, 2 contract of service and 1 job order employee as of December 31, 2024.

=== Revival proposal ===
In 2016, then-President Rodrigo Duterte included Panay Railways among his administration's priorities under the Build! Build! Build! program. However, the plans were never finalized.

On March 24, 2022, Panay Railways announced it was opening to foreign ownership to facilitate the reconstruction of its former train lines. The plan received support from the current administration of President Bongbong Marcos, with several foreign firms expressing interest, including China Railway International Group Ltd. (CRIG) and United Kingdom-based Global Wealth Centres. As of January 2023, eleven investors from Turkey, the United States, Saudi Arabia, Japan, England, and China had shown interest in reviving Panay Island's railway system.

The Department of Transportation (DOTr) received financing from the 2022 General Appropriations Act (Republic Act No. 11639) toward the cost of Conduct of the Feasibility Study for the Panay Railway Project with an amount of close to ₱50 million pesos. On September 30, 2025, The Department of Transportation conducted a public bidding for a comprehensive feasibility study of the Panay Railway. The study aim to examine the technical, economic, and environmental viability of restoring rail transport in the Panay Island. It also aims to assess potential routes, costs, and financing models to ensure that any revival project would be sustainable and responsive to community needs.

The first phase of the plan is to reconstruct the original route of Panay Railways which was 117 kilometers long, including 19 permanent and 10 flag stations. It will reconnect La Paz and Jaro (now districts of Iloilo City), Pavia, Santa Barbara, New Lucena, Pototan, Dingle, Dueñas, and Passi City in Iloilo; and Dumarao, Dao, Panitan, Cuartero, and Loctugan in Capiz, reaching Roxas City.

The revived railway system is expected to have an expanded coverage area. Phase 2 will involve constructing new railway routes from Roxas City to Kalibo, Aklan, and then to Caticlan in Malay, Aklan. Phase 3 will cover a new railway route from Caticlan, Malay in Aklan, to San Jose, Antique. Phase 4 will extend from San Jose, Antique, to Iloilo City via the towns of San Joaquin and Miag-ao in Iloilo province.

In Iloilo City, the original trains ended at the passenger terminal along the wharf near the Iloilo Customs House, close to the current Iloilo City Hall. The trains crossed what is now the Drilon Bridge from La Paz and ran down the banks of the Iloilo River to Muelle Loney at the Port of Iloilo. However, Iloilo City Mayor Jerry Treñas announced his opposition to the Panay Railway operating within the city due to the displacement of residents in the Jaro and La Paz districts. He noted that the city has an efficient public transport and road system that could connect to the railway to be constructed outside the city. Mayor Treñas suggested relocating the main passenger terminal to Santa Barbara, which already hosts a station previously used and also serves as the entry point to Iloilo International Airport.

== Panay line ==
Panay line
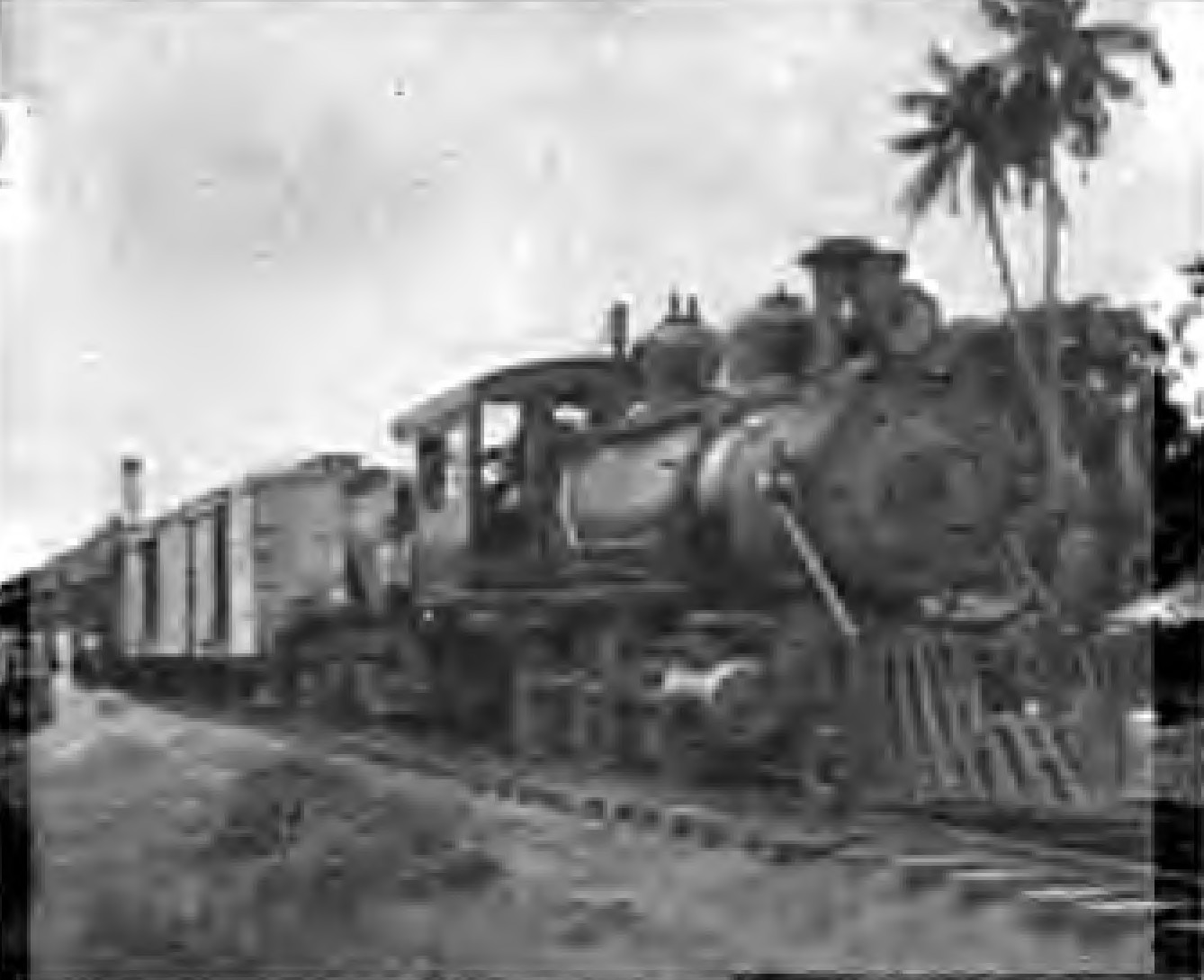
- Panay Line in 1917

Overview
- Owner: Panay Railways, Inc.
- Locale: Panay
- Termini: Iloilo City; Roxas City
- Stations: 19 permanent and 10 flagstops

Service
- Type: Heavy rail

History
- Opened: 1907
- Closed: 1985 (passenger); 1989 (freight)

Technical
- Line length: 117 km (73 mi)
- Number of tracks: 1
- Track gauge: 3 ft 6 in (1,067 mm)

The original route was 117 kilometers (73 mi) long, included 19 permanent and 10 flag stations and connected the then-towns of La Paz and Jaro (now districts of Iloilo City), Pavia, Santa Barbara, New Lucena, Pototan, Dingle, Dueñas and Passi in Iloilo and Dumarao, Dao, Panitan, Cuartero and Loctugan in Capiz. It reached Roxas City. It had a total of 46 bridges. In Iloilo City, the trains ended at passenger terminal along the wharf next to the Customs House and near where the current fast ferry terminal and the Iloilo City Hall. Trains ran across Drilon Bridge from La Paz and down the bank of the Iloilo River to Muelle Loney in the Port of Iloilo. In the 1980s, a 12-kilometer spur was constructed from Duenas to Calinog, Iloilo to serve a sugar refinery in Iloilo. Operations ceased in 1983. Fidel V. Ramos, who would eventually become President of the Philippines, was vice chairman of the Philvidec Railway, Inc.

Since ceasing operations, the company has continued to exist and periodically announces plans to rebuild the railway, either along the original route or with a change to include a connection to the Iloilo International Airport. Some plans include a second phase to extend the line from Roxas City to the Caticlan port, from where ferries to the resort island of Boracay depart. As of 2014, the Philippine national government was opposed to any rebuilding of the line because it is expensive and not economically viable.

On March 3, 2005, the demolition of 44 of 46 bridges was begun. The bridge in Passi City was spared because of its historical value as an execution site of Philippine guerrillas by Japanese occupation forces during World War II. The Drilon Bridge was also excluded as it had been donated to Iloilo City. The demolition of the bridges was done as the first part of a planned rebuilding of the rail line. The rebuilding has not taken place. In 2015, the mayor of Iloilo, Jed Patrick E. Mabilog, said "We’re talking with the PPP (Public-Private Partnership) Center about connecting Iloilo to the rest of the island of Panay by rail."

Like many railways, Panay Railways owns property. The railway right-of-way stretching from Iloilo City to Roxas is 30 meters wide. Further, it owns lands used for stations, terminals and rail yards. It currently leases its property to landless households (among others) from which it derives revenue to defray the personnel and administrative costs of looking after its assets. As of 2012, they had more than 4,000 lessees, all of which are only allowed to build buildings of light materials and must vacate the property if needed to reestablish the railway. In April 2014, the city government of Iloilo City agreed to purchase a 2,000 sq m lot, located along Muelle Loney near the Iloilo City Hall, owned Panay Railways for 24,446,250 Philippine pesos. The statue of Nicholas Loney that stands on the lot will not be moved but the Bureau of Fire Protection station also on the lot might be. This lot used to be a location of a terminal of the rail line.

== Cebu line ==
Cebu line
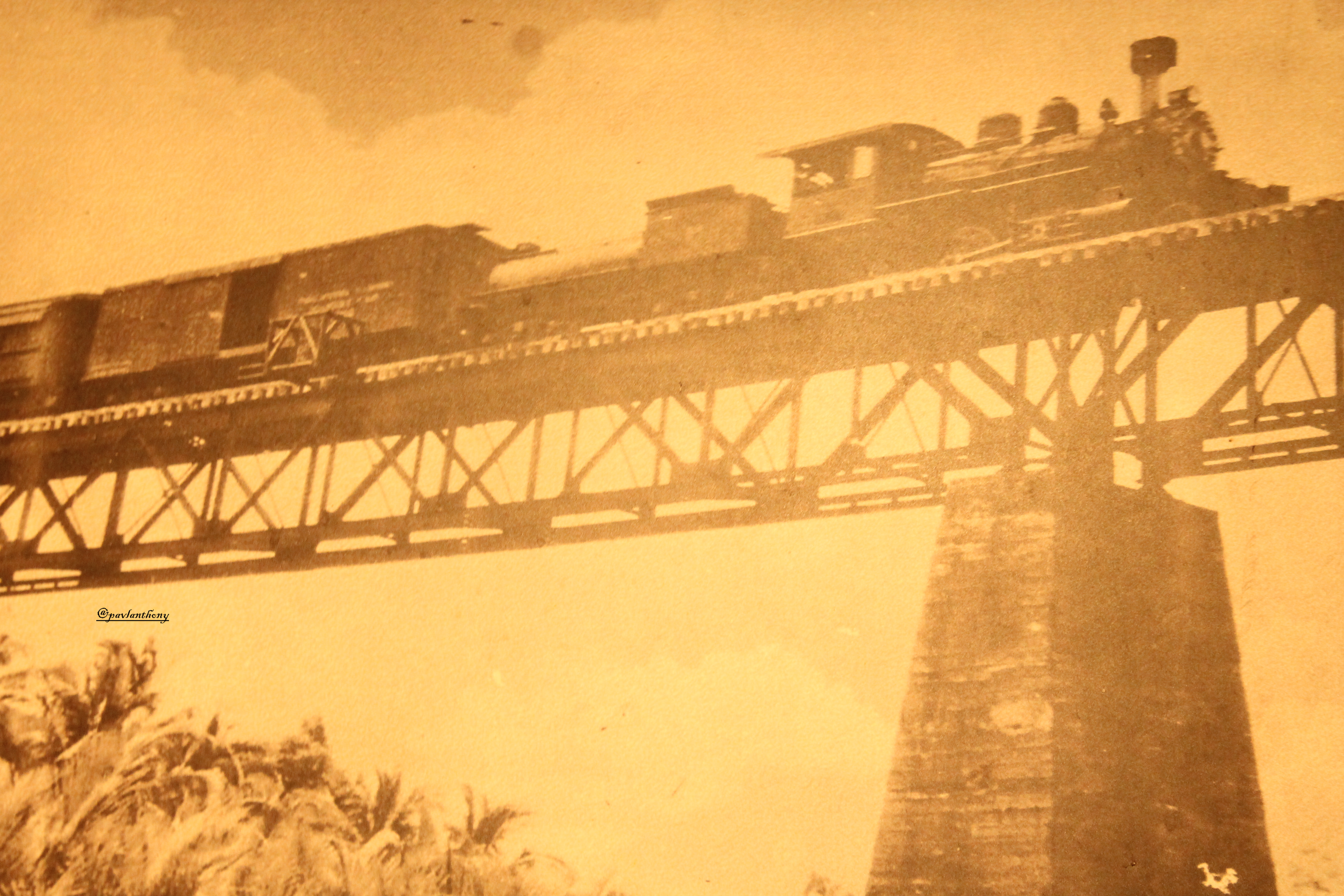
- Cebu railway line in Carcar

Overview
- Owner: Panay Railways, Inc.
- Locale: Cebu
- Termini: Argao, Cebu; Danao, Cebu

Service
- Type: Heavy rail

History
- Opened: 1911
- Closed: 1942

Technical
- Line length: 92 km (57 mi)
- Track gauge: 3 ft 6 in (1,067 mm)

The Philippine Railway Company, along with operating the Panay line, operated a line in Cebu for about 30 years from 1911 to 1942, when operations ceased because of the Japanese occupation of the Philippines during World War II. The line ran from Argao in the south, through Cebu City, then to Danao in the north. The line was built by the related Philippine Railways Construction Company.

Central Station was at the corner of Leon Kilat and P. Del Rosario streets, which is what now the South Bus Terminal, CityMall Bacalso, the Elizabeth Mall, and the SSS building. There was a short spur from there to the port. From Argao (where the station is now the town's fire station), the tracks went north and ran to Sab-ang, Sibonga (the station is now a library of Simala Elementary School); Valladolid, Carcar (the station is now a restaurant); Cebu City; then ending at Sitio Estasyonan, Danao, with the sitio's name from "station". The Rotunda in the poblacion of Danao was where the train would turn around, giving the place its name.

During World War II, the bridges, tracks and Central Station were all bombed. The resulting damage was very severe that the railway never recovered. The Cebu line was a historic and groundbreaking rail that heritage advocates have been pushing for its reconstruction since the late 1970s up to the 21st century.

== Gallery ==
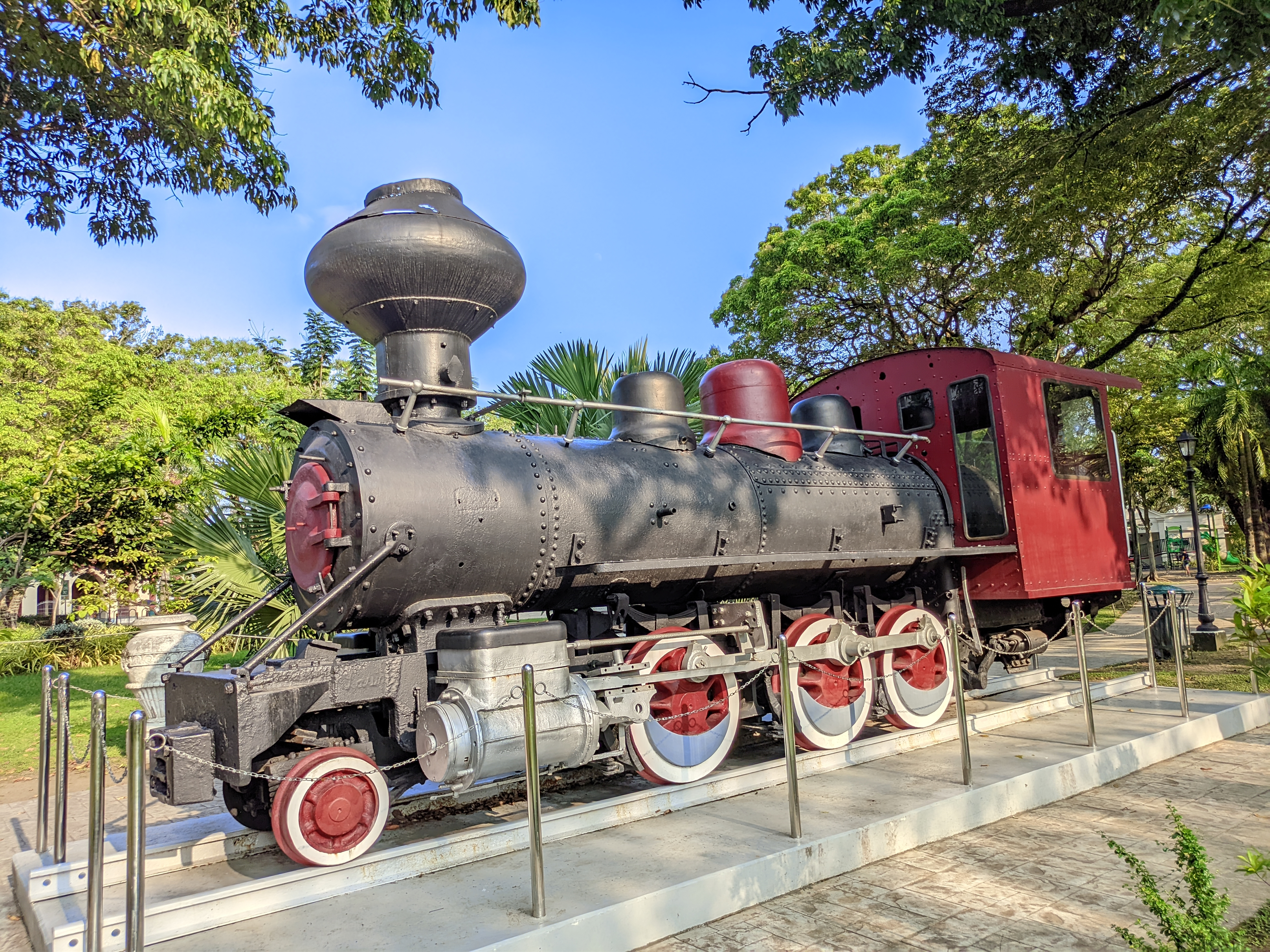
Engine of the Panay Railways on display in the Iloilo City Proper's plaza, Plaza Libertad (formerly Plaza Alfonso XII).

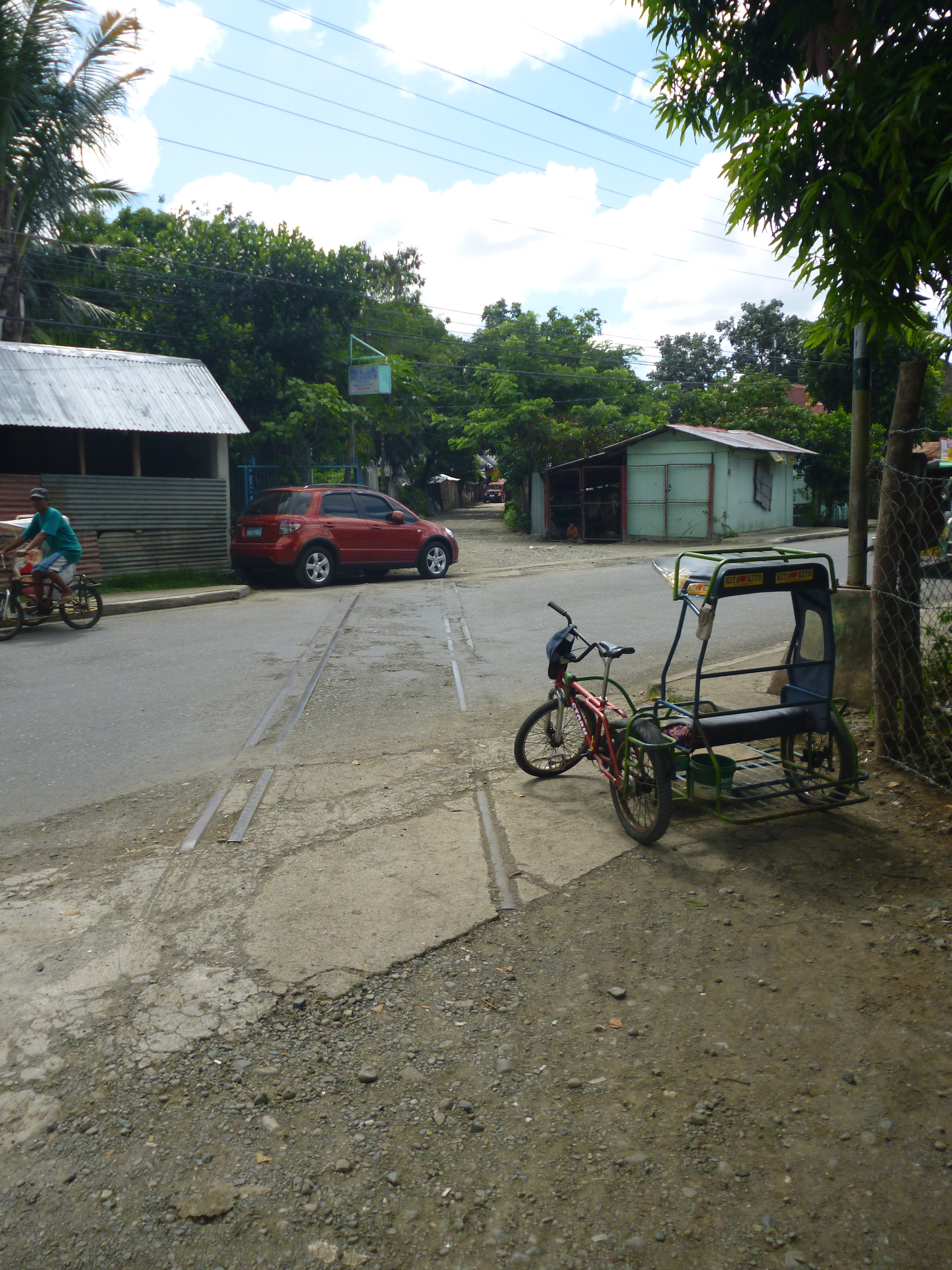
Remains of tracks in Pavia, Iloilo, 2012

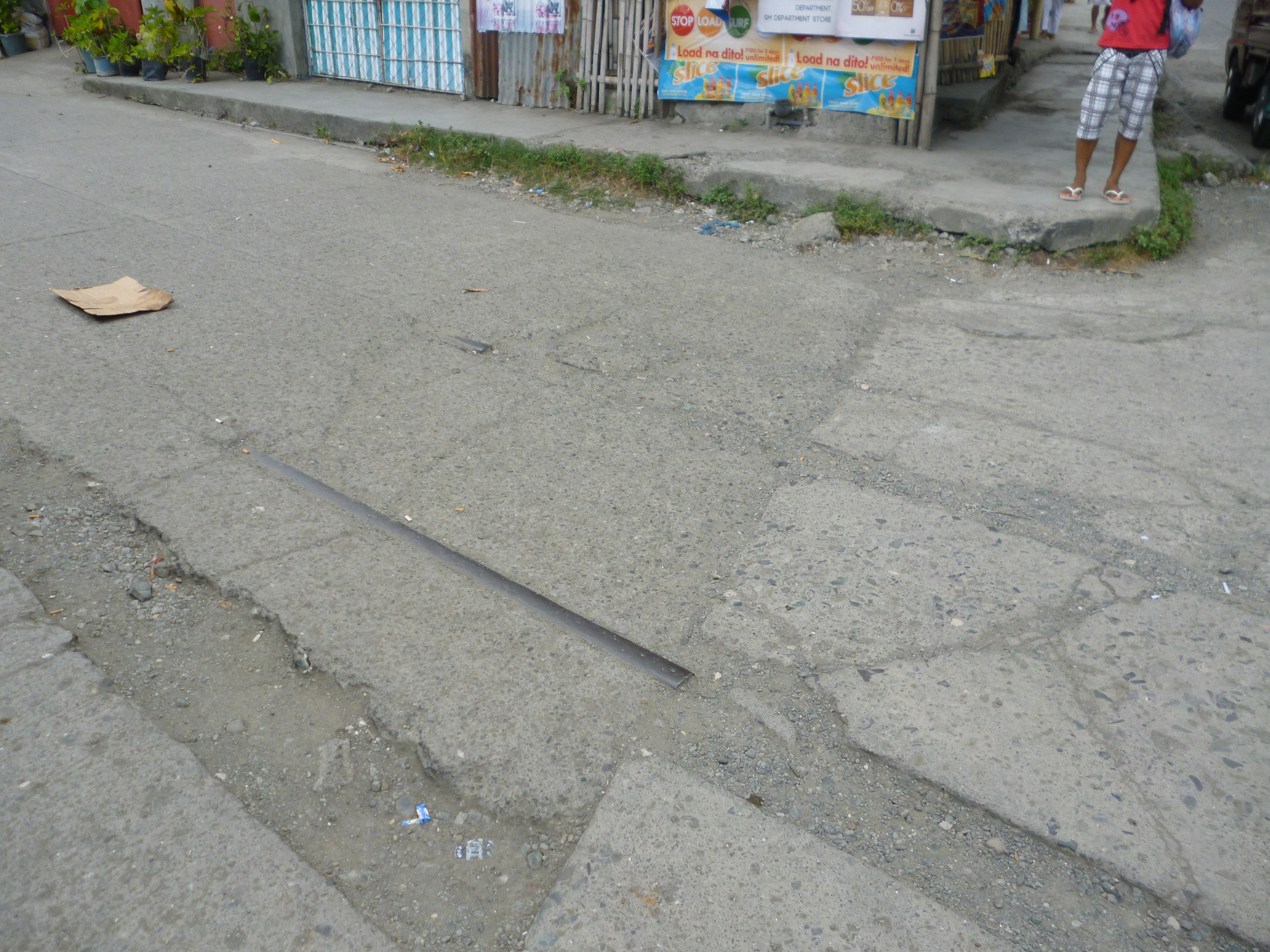
Remnant tracks in La Paz, Iloilo City (2012)

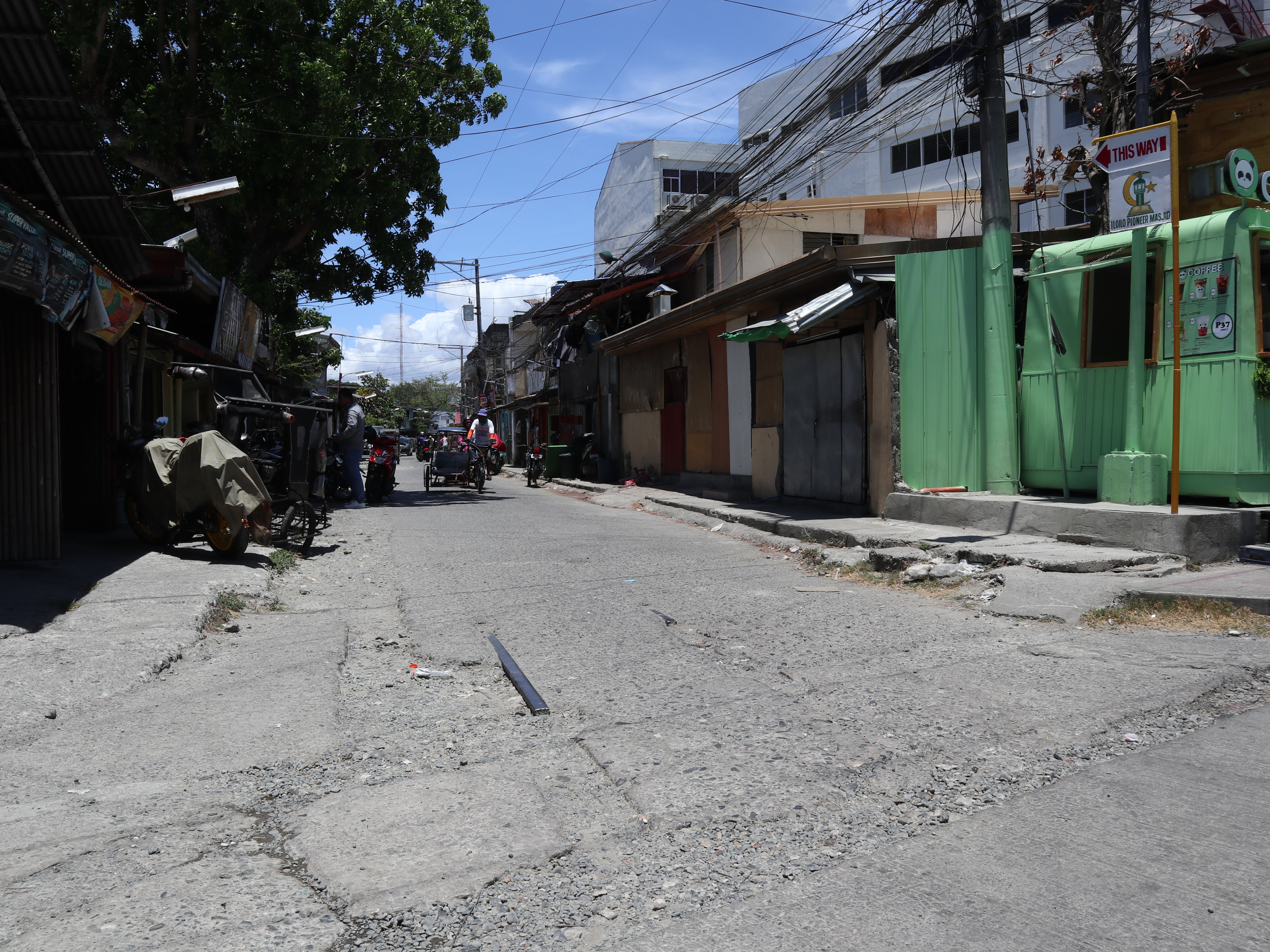
Remnant tracks in, Arroyo St., La Paz, Iloilo City (2024)

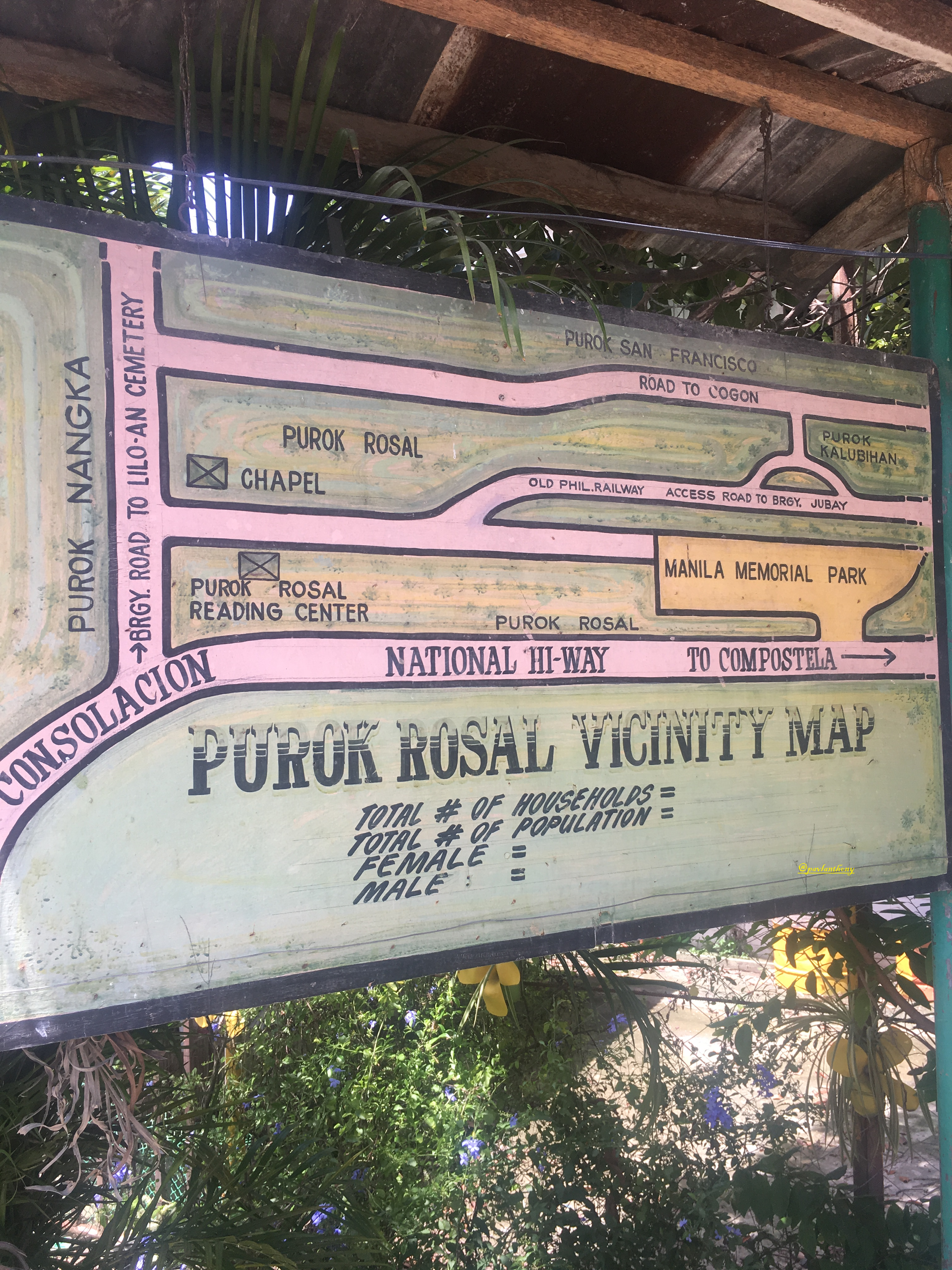
Barangay map in Poblacion, Liloan, Cebu depicting the old Philippine Railway Line route

== See also ==
- Philippine National Railways
- Rail transportation in the Philippines
- Sugar industry of the Philippines
