= Cebu South Bus Terminal =

Public bus terminal in Cebu City, Philippines

General information
- Location: N. Bacalso Avenue, Cebu City; Philippines
- Coordinates: 10°17′51.45″N 123°53′36.54″E
- Owner: Cebu Provincial Government
- Operator: Cebu Provincial Government
- Bus stands: 40

History
- Opened: February 1993

Passengers
- 40,000–50,000
Location

The Cebu South Bus Terminal (CSBT) is a bus station in Cebu City, Philippines. CSBT is operated by the Cebu Provincial Government with Carmen Quijano as its current operations manager. The station is a hub for buses servicing southern Cebu and nearby provinces such as Negros Oriental, Negros Occidental and the Zamboanga Peninsula.

== Location ==
The Cebu South Bus Terminal is located on a 1.2-hectare (3.0-acre) site along N. Bacalso Avenue in Cebu City where the 60-mile main railway terminal depot of Cebu used to stand. The Philippine Railway Company, along with the Panay line, operated a line in Cebu from 1911 to 1942, when operations ceased because of the Japanese occupation of the Philippines. The line connects Danao south through Cebu City to Argao. It is situated in between the Region 7 Land Transportation Office and CityMall Bacalso, a community mall. Nearby landmarks include the Cebu City Medical Center, Region 7 Bureau of Fire Protection Office and Elizabeth Mall. The Philippine Star reported plans to transfer the terminal to South Road Properties and Talisay, Cebu.

== History ==
The terminal's construction was part of the project components under the Metro Cebu Development Project Phase 1 (MCDP I) wherein the Regional Development Council for Region VII, through the Government of the Philippines, entered into a loan agreement with Japan's Official Development Assistance to fund the said project. Its construction was supposed to commence in January 1990 and was expected to be completed by December 1991 but fell 22 months behind schedule due to the time required in clearing the area from squatters.

The construction eventually began in November 1991 and was completed by August 1992 with the number of loading bays reduced from the proposed 48 to just 40. It was turned over to the Cebu Provincial Government in February 1993.

During her first tenure as provincial governor, Gwendolyn Garcia imposed a ₱5 terminal fee to passengers of the terminal as it underwent a ₱6 million-renovation which turned it into a fully air-conditioned facility. Ambulant vendors were also removed from the vicinity of the terminal and terminal fee for buses was increased from ₱50 to ₱100 as part of increasing the province's revenue.

On March 29, 2020, the terminal, along with the Cebu North Bus Terminal, was temporarily closed as Cebu City, where it was located, was placed under enhanced community quarantine (ECQ) due to the COVID-19 pandemic and reopened on September 9, 2020.

== Services ==
=== Provincial ===
==== Bus ====
- Chan Transit – operates bus service to and from Dumanjug.
- Jegans Bus Liner – operates bus service to and from Toledo City via Pinamungajan.
- Jerel Transport – operates Sunrays Bus Lines which operates bus service to and from Samboan via Oslob and Santander.
- Jhade Trans – operates bus service to and from Aloguinsan via Pinamungajan.
- JRK South Transport – operates SEPO Bus which operates bus service to and from Sibonga, especially for those heading to the Simala-Lindogon Church, and Aloguinsan via Pinamungajan
- JS Calvo Transport – operates Gabe Transit and Calvo Bus Lines which operates bus service to and from Toledo City via Balamban.
- Metrolink Express Liner – operates bus service to and from Bato in Samboan via Barili.
- Vallacar Transit – operates Ceres Liner, Sugbo Transit, and Sugbo Urban which services routes to destinations in southern Cebu, Negros Island, Siquijor, and Zamboanga Peninsula.
- VG Corominas Transit – operates bus service to and from Tuburan via Balamban, Asturias.
- Provincial buses such as Allowie, Andrew Liner, EDC, Pioneer, Skippes and Yeoman which operate to and from Sibonga and Canoneo which operates to and from Toledo City via Pinamungajan.
- Provincial buses such as Befel Liner, Dos Hermanos and Inday Jean which operate to and from Carcar and Socorro which operate to and from Dumanjug.

=== Intercity ===
==== Bus ====
- Sugbo Transit Express – operates Sugbo Tours, a bus service to Mactan–Cebu International Airport via Mandaue City.
