= CBRT =

CBRT may refer to:

- CBRT-DT, a Canadian television station
- Cebu Bus Rapid Transit System, the Philippines
- Central Bank of the Republic of Turkey
- Cube root, an arithmetic operation
