= CityMall Bacalso =

Shopping mall in Cebu City, Philippines

- Location: Cebu City
- Coordinates: 10°17′53″N 123°53′40″E
- Address: N. Bacalso Avenue, Cebu City
- Opened: April 30, 2022; 4 years ago
- Developer: DoubleDragon Corporation
- Manager: CityMall Commercial Centers Inc.
- Floors: 2
- Public transit: 01C Private; 01K Urgello; 02B Pier; 04D Plaza Housing-Lahug; 09F Basak, Pardo; 10F Bulacao, Pardo; 12D 12I Labangon; C Il Corso-SM Seaside-Jones-Ayala-IT Park; Future: CBRT South Bus Terminal

CityMall Bacalso is a community mall located in N. Bacalso Avenue, Cebu City developed by DoubleDragon Corporation. It sits on a 1.1-hectare (2.7-acre) property located between Elizabeth Mall and Cebu South Bus Terminal.

== History ==
In June 2014, DoubleDragon Corporation announced that its subsidiary CityMall Commercial Centers Inc. (CMCCI) signed a 30-year lease agreement with Dunes and Eagle Land Development Corp. for a commercial lot along N. Bacalso Avenue, Cebu City where a Grand CityMall will be constructed. It was expected to be completed in 2015 but the project hit a snag when stockholders of the dissolved Ludo and Luym Development Corp. (LudoDev) appealed to desist the construction since the lot was transferred illegally to DoubleDragon Corporation pending the result of a court case.

Its construction was further halted on February 22, 2017 by Cebu City's Office of the Building Official (OBO) after the crane rented by Metro Dyna Build Incorporated (MDBI), the mall's contractor, collapsed on four houses and injured one woman.

The mall finally opened on April 30, 2022 with MerryMart Grocery as the anchor store.

== See also ==
- Elizabeth Mall
- Ayala Center Cebu
- SM City Cebu
- SM Seaside City
- Robinsons Galleria Cebu
