= Elizabeth Mall =

Elizabeth Mall may refer to:

- Elizabeth Street Mall, a pedestrian street mall in Hobart, Tasmania
- Elizabeth Mall (Cebu City), a shopping mall located in Cebu City, Philippines
