= Archdiocesan Shrine of Santa Teresa de Avila =

Roman Catholic church in Cebu, Philippines

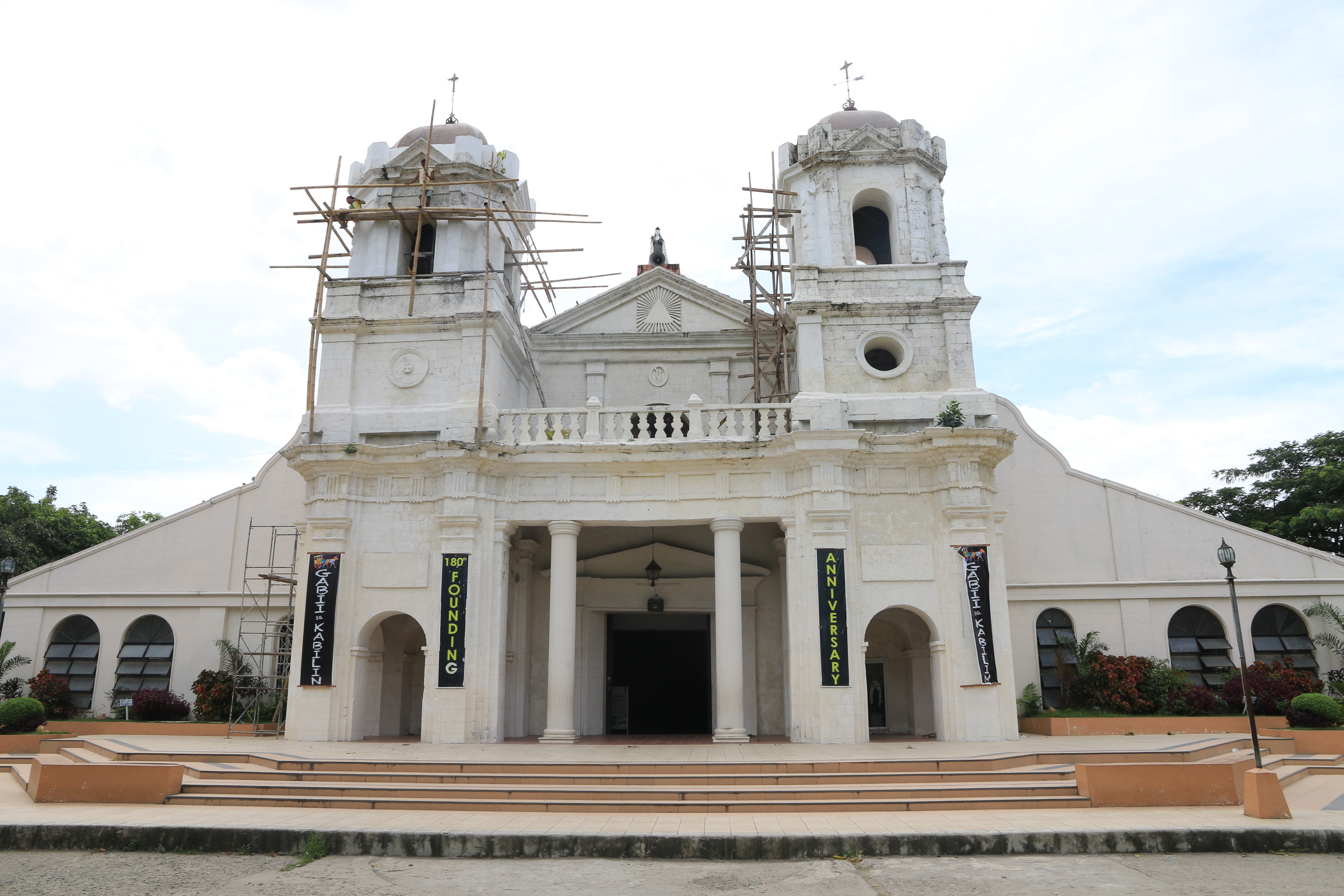
- Church facade in 2017

- Location in Metro Cebu Location in Cebu Location in the Visayas Location in the Philippines
- 10°14′38.4″N 123°50′52.3″E
- Location: Barangay Poblacion, Talisay
- Country: Philippines
- Denomination: Roman Catholic

History
- Former name: Santa Teresa de Avila Parish Church
- Status: Parish church
- Founded: August 16, 1836
- Dedication: Teresa of Avila

Architecture
- Functional status: Active
- Style: Classical Graeco Roman
- Years built: 1836 - 1848
- Completed: 1848

Specifications
- Length: 72 meters (236 ft)
- Width: 33 meters (108 ft)
- Materials: Coral stones

Administration
- Archdiocese: Cebu

The Archdiocesan Shrine of Santa Teresa de Avila, previously known as Santa Teresa de Avila Church, is a Roman Catholic church located in Talisay, Cebu, Philippines. It is under the jurisdiction of the Archdiocese of Cebu. Built in 1836 until 1848, architecturally, the church is in classical Graeco-Roman style, featuring the facade's two bell towers connected by a porch with two supporting columns on the foyer. On October 15, 2007, it was declared an archdiocesan shrine and pilgrims could receive plenary indulgence for a year.

== History ==
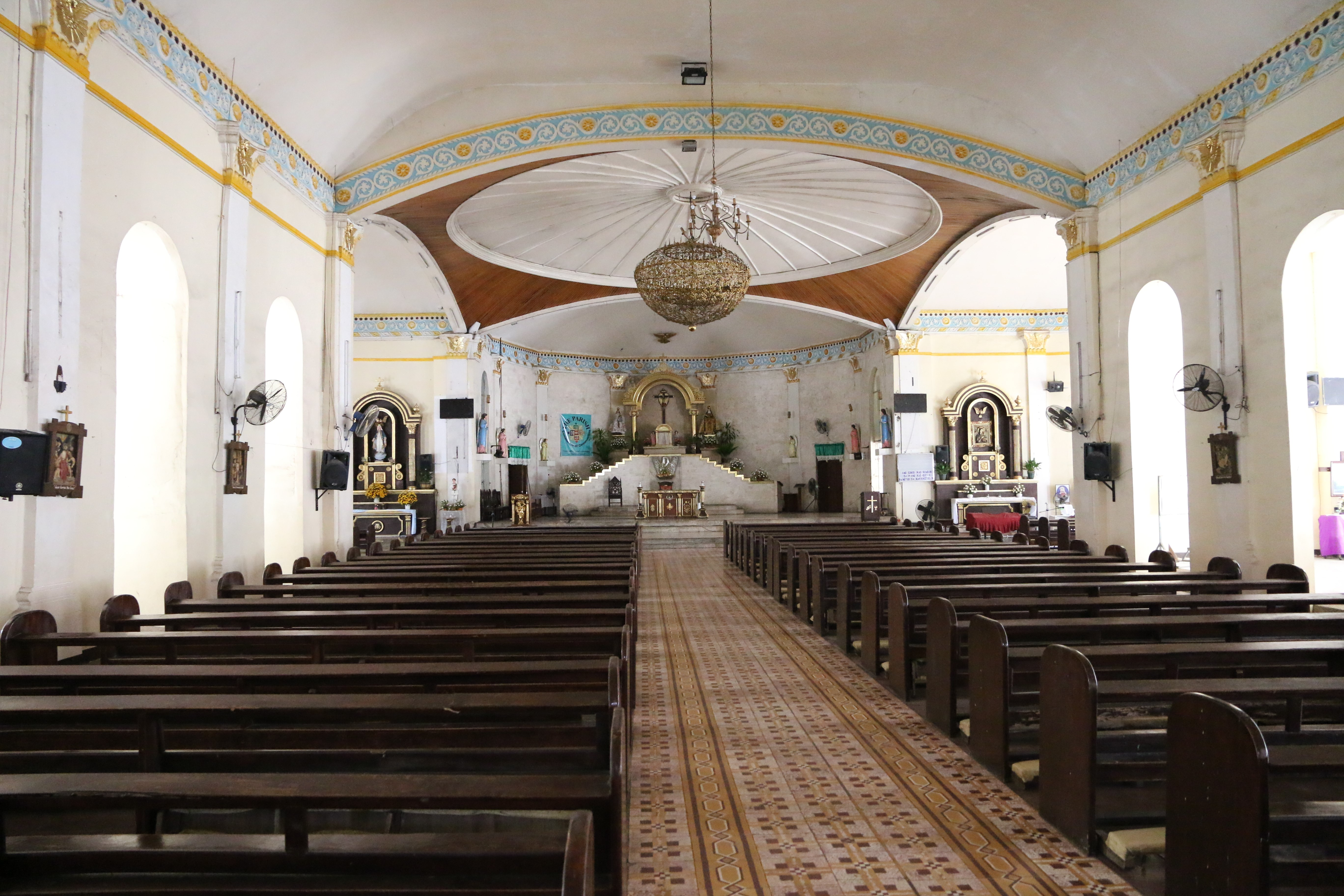
Main nave leading up to the crossing, 2017

The church's name was in honor of Teresa of Avila, its patron saint. Talisay during the Spanish times was a property of Augustinian friars and a visita of San Nicolas, which was a district south of then municipality of Cebu and to which it was later annexed. The area separated from San Nicolas when the local population boomed and on August 16, 1836, the parish was declared independent under Juan Soriano by virtue of a royal decree signed on April 25, 1836. Interestingly the tomb of another priest possibly the predecessor of Juan Soriano is still extant inside one of the small chapels inside the church.

Construction began in 1836 and the works were completed in 1848. When a typhoon caused the destruction of the church's roof made of clay tiles, it was renovated with iron sheets in 1877 and in 1894, the interiors were decorated. Towards the conclusion of World War II, the building sustained heavy damage to all parts of the church and the nearby convent, as well as its records, did not survive the war. One of the few parts of the church that sustained little damage was the facade which still remains in its original state. Post-war restoration efforts were carried out by Teofilo Camomot and because of damage sustained during World War 2 the roof was lowered significantly.

=== Archdiocesan shrine ===
On October 15, 2007, coinciding its fiesta celebration, the parish was declared as an archdiocesan shrine by Cardinal Ricardo Vidal, then Archbishop of Cebu. Pilgrims who visited the church on certain days of the month between the declaration date until October 15, 2008, would receive plenary indulgence.

== Architecture ==
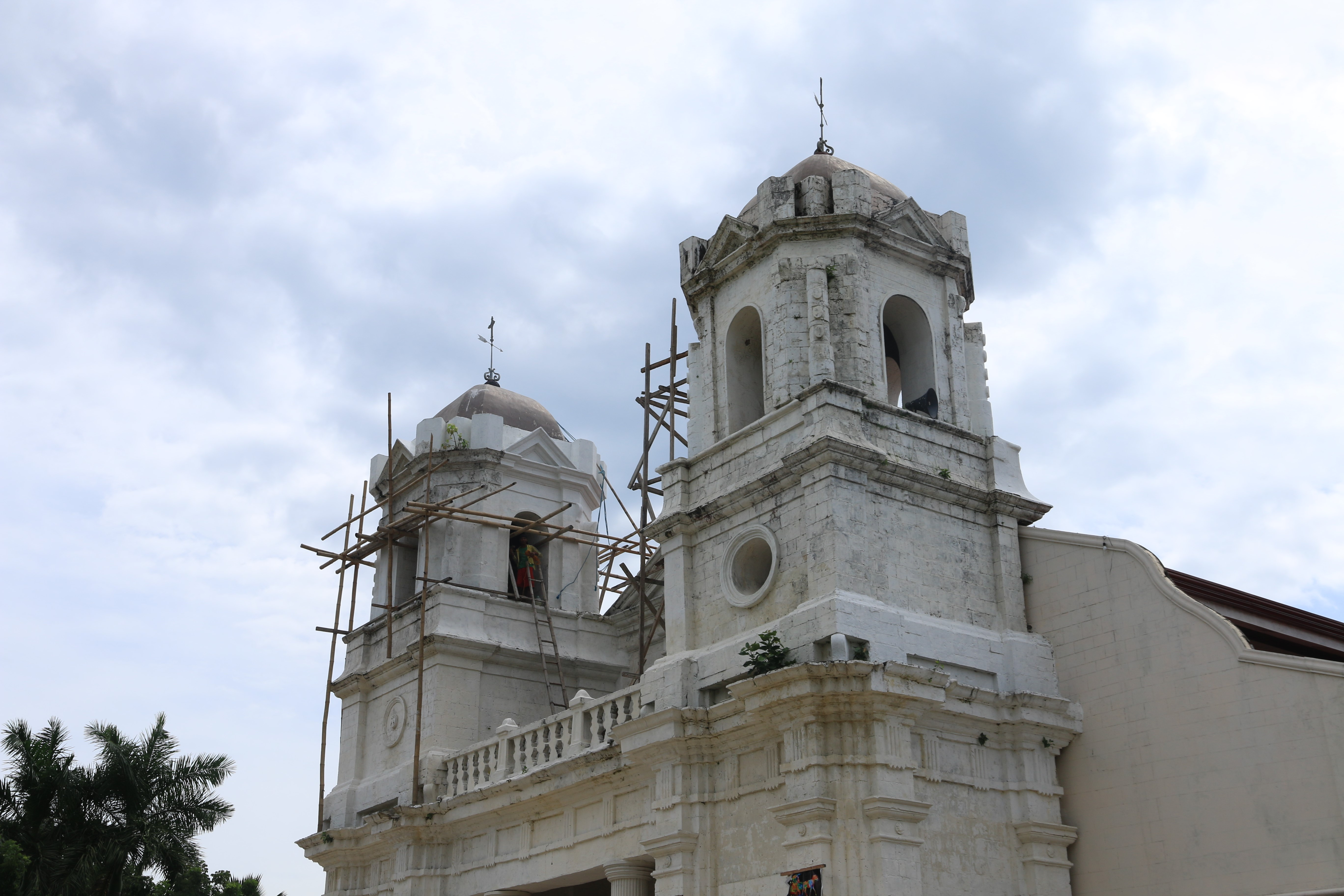
Twin belfries on the church's facade

The church was made from coral stones and contained embellished interiors and five gilded altars. Its original design was cruciform with two semicircular transepts and the twin belfries on each side of the façade, with a connecting balustraded portico that is supported by two columns on the main entrance, are its prominent feature. Inside, hanging above the crossing is a large round chandelier. According to Filipinas Heritage Library, the church used "round arch, rectangular piers with engaged shafts, and an arcade." Felipe Redondo, writing in the late 19th century, described its architecture as Doric (classical Graeco-Roman) in style.

The church's structure was remodeled, and two new wings were added on each side of the main nave. Its original stonewalls were preserved, its old arched windows and side entrances still visible to this day.
