= Talisay, Cebu =

Component city in Cebu, Philippines

Talisay
- Component city
- City of Talisay
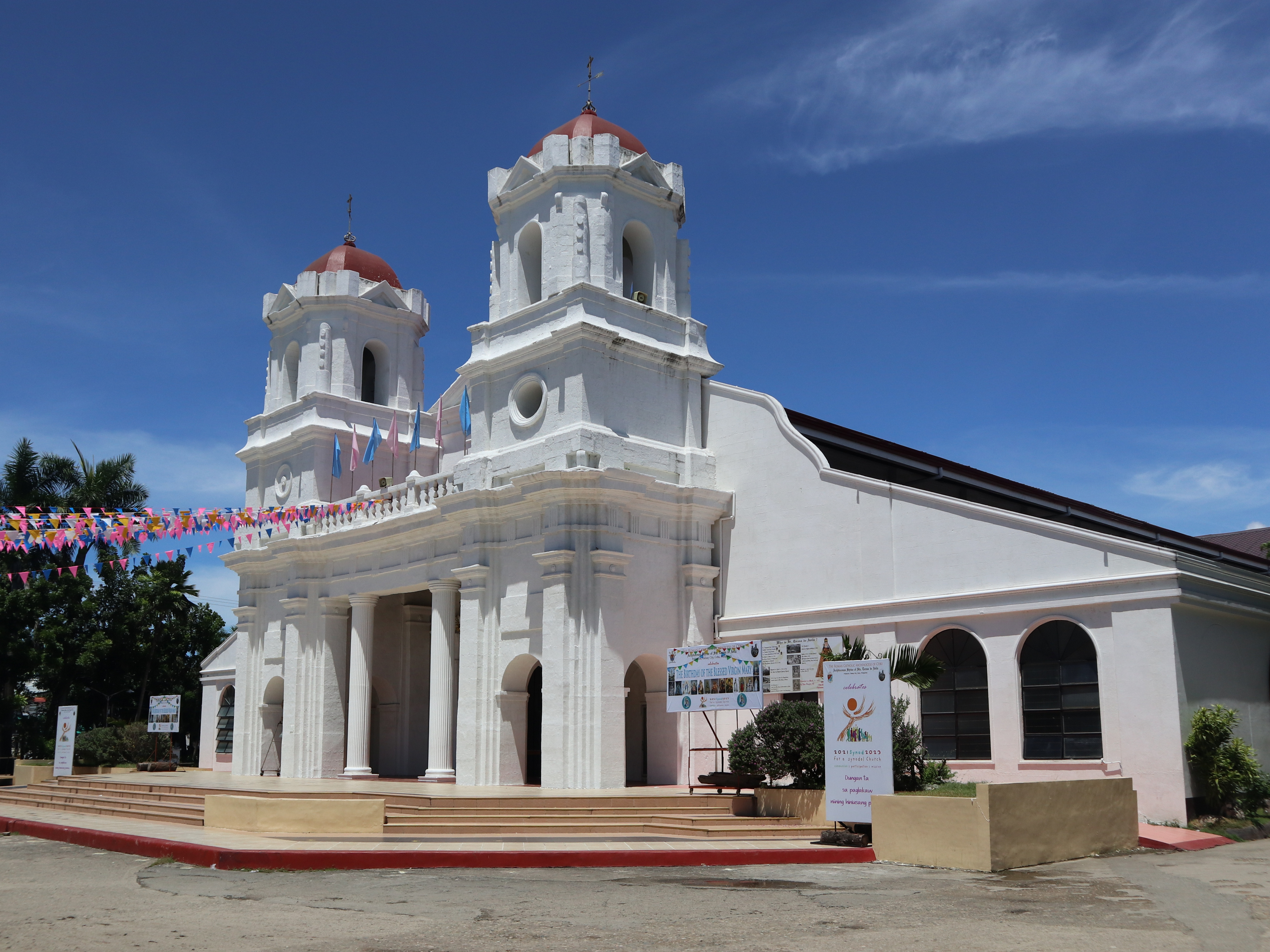
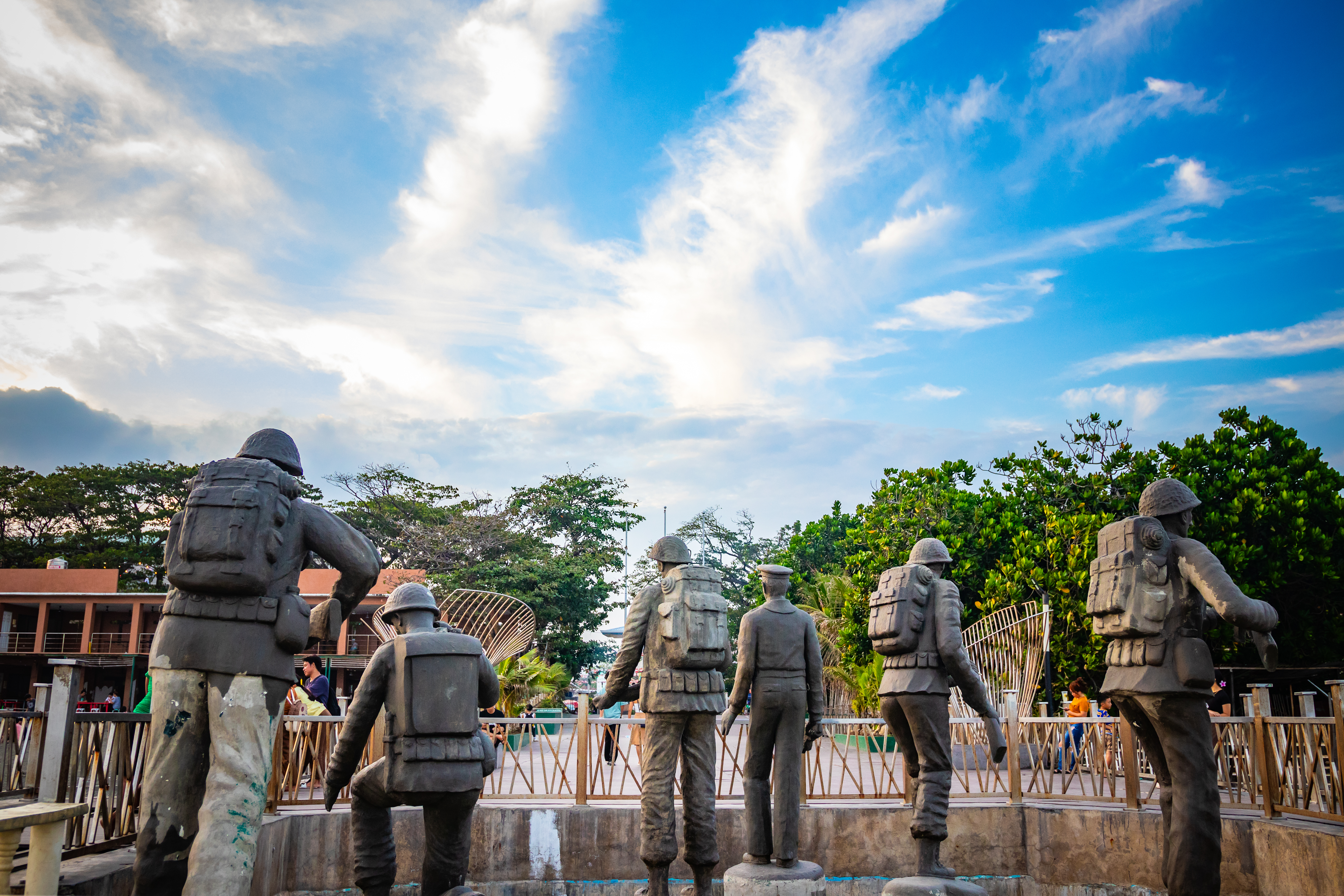
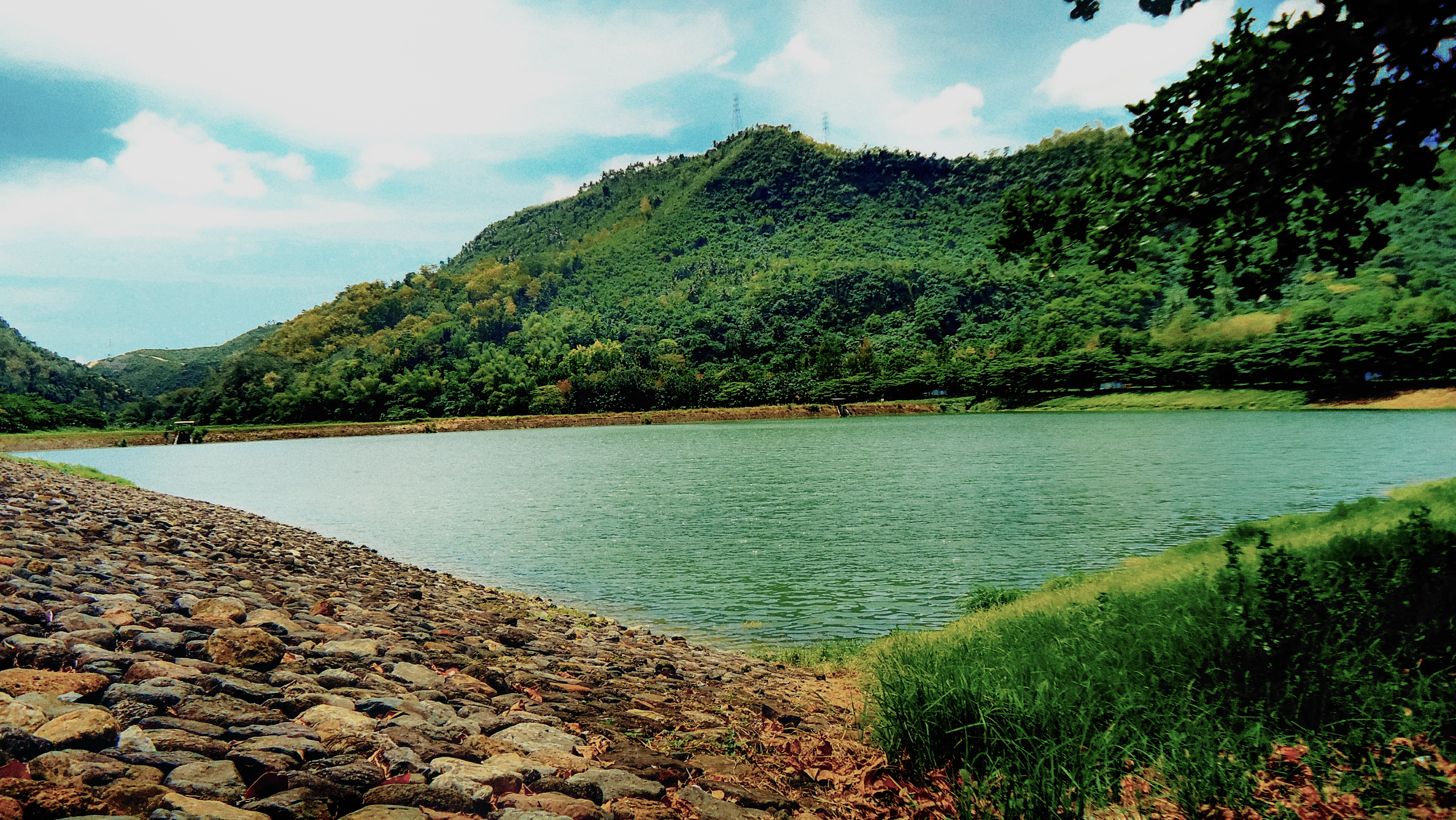
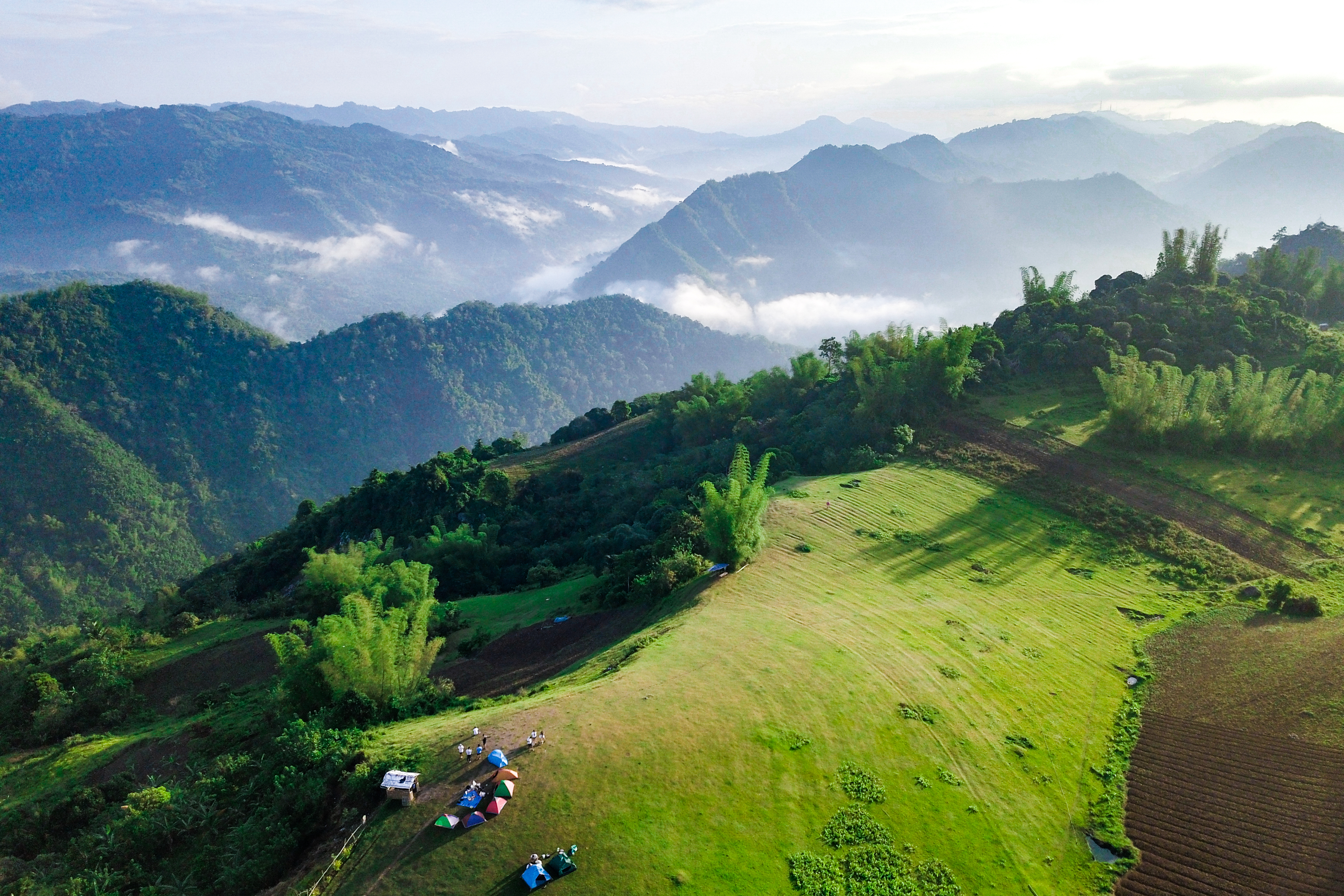
- Left to right, from the top: Talisay City Hall, Archdiocesan Shrine of Santa Teresa de Avila, Talisay Landing Site, Jaclupan Dam, Campinsa Hills.

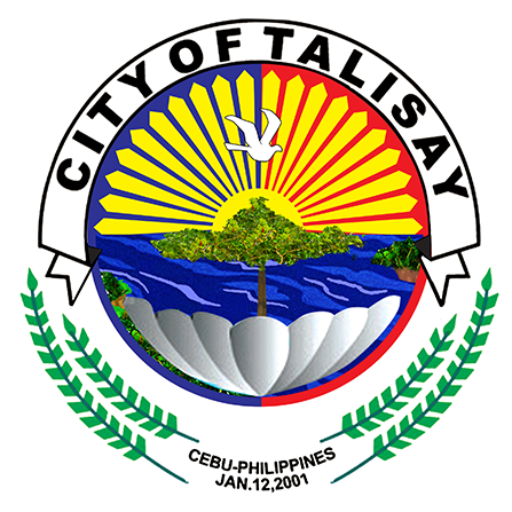
- Seal
- Etymology: Magtalisay Tree (Terminalia catappa)
- Nicknames: Aquatic City in Cebu; The Gateway City of the South
- Anthem: Abante Talisay
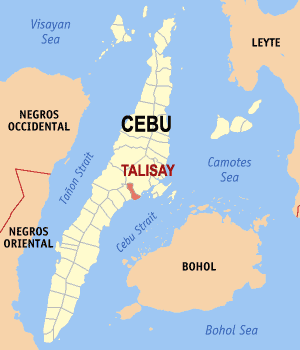
- Map of Cebu with Talisay highlighted
- Interactive map of Talisay
- Location within the Philippines
- Coordinates: 10°15′N 123°50′E
- Country: Philippines
- Region: Central Visayas
- Province: Cebu
- District: 1st district
- Founded: 1648
- Chartered: 1849
- Cityhood: December 30, 2000
- Barangays: 22 (see Barangays)

Government
  - Type: Sangguniang Panlungsod
  - Mayor: Gerald Anthony V. Gullas Jr. (NP)
  - Vice Mayor: Richard Francis F. Aznar (NP)
  - Representative: Rhea Mae A. Gullas (NP)
  - City Council: Members: Eduardo R. Gullas III; Marc Arthur I. Bas; Socrates C. Fernandez; Alito D. Bacaltos; Lester L. Daan; Danilo F. Caballero; Ferdinand L. Rabaya; Rodylle Hyacinth C. Cabigas; Ofelia B. Ylanan; Dan Andrew A. Villaver; Josefina C. Concial ^{‡}; John Van Exel M. Restauro ^{◌}; ‡ ex officio ABC president; ◌ ex officio SK chairman
  - Electorate: 155,392 voters (2025)

Area
  - Total: 39.87 km^{2} (15.39 sq mi)
- Elevation: 108 m (354 ft)
- Highest elevation: 915 m (3,002 ft)
- Lowest elevation: 0 m (0 ft)

Population (2024 census)
  - Total: 263,832
  - Density: 6,617/km^{2} (17,140/sq mi)
  - Households: 63,066

Economy
  - Income class: 1st city income class
  - Poverty incidence: 12.78% (2023)
  - Revenue: ₱ 1,620 million (2024)
  - Assets: ₱ 3,381 million (2024)
  - Expenditure: ₱ 1,045 million (2024)
  - Liabilities: ₱ 840.5 million (2024)

Service provider
  - Electricity: Visayan Electric Company (VECO)
  - Water: Metropolitan Cebu Water District (MCWD)
- Time zone: UTC+8 (PST)
- ZIP code: 6045
- PSGC: 072250000
- IDD : area code: +63 (0)32
- Native language: Cebuano
- Major religions: Roman Catholicism
- Feast Day: October 15
- Patron saint: Saint Teresa of Avila

Talisay, officially the City of Talisay (Cebuano: Dakbayan sa Talisay; Filipino: Lungsod ng Talisay), is a component city in the province of Cebu, Philippines. According to the 2024 census, it has a population of 263,832 people, making it the most populous component city in Visayas. The city is applying for a Highly Urbanized City (HUC) status.

The city's name is taken from the talisay tree which is abundant in the area.

== History ==
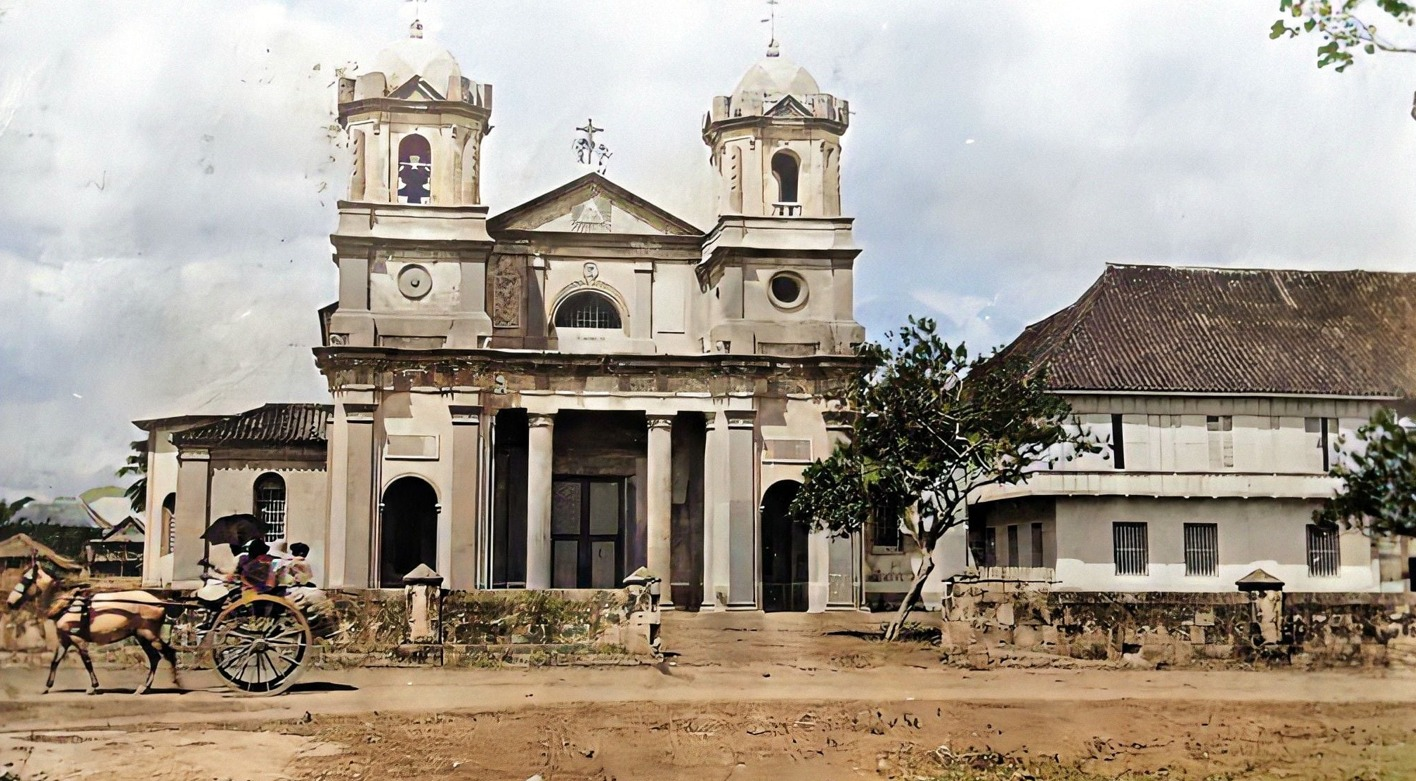
Santa. Teresa de Avila Church

Talisay was founded in 1648 as an estate owned by the Augustinians. In 1849, it was converted into a municipality with its first gobernadorcillo, Silverio Fernandez.

During both the American colonial period and World War II, Talisay served as a haven of colonial military forces. The municipality served as the center of guerrilla intelligence operations for the Philippine resistance movement in Cebu during World War II. The returning United States liberation forces landed on the beaches of Talisay on March 26, 1945. This was part of Operation Victor II which was implemented by General Douglas MacArthur in order to regain the islands of Cebu, Bohol, and Negros from the Japanese soldiers. With the joint efforts of the US forces, the Philippine Commonwealth forces, and the Cebuano guerrillas, Cebu was liberated on March 27, 1945, and the Japanese forces in the province eventually surrendered on August 29. To remember this victory and as an honor to the Cebuano veterans, Philippine Republic Act No. 7280 was enacted in 1992 which declared March 26 of every year a special non-working holiday in the municipality of Talisay, Cebu. Later in 2013, the law was expanded under Republic Act No. 10359, so that the holiday will be celebrated in the entire province of Cebu.

=== Cityhood ===
In 2000, the municipality of Talisay was converted into a city through Republic Act No. 8979. The municipality is now linked to Cebu City via the South Coastal Highway from Lawaan which was opened in 2004. This brought some recent inward investment in the form of subdivisions, but some were hastily planned, and thus were plagued by problems. Conflict occurred between the residents of the mountain barangay of Maghaway and those of Crown Asia's Azienda Milan and Venezia subdivisions.

== Geography ==
Primarily a residential and trading center, Talisay lies within the Metro Cebu area. It is bordered to the north by Cebu City, to the west is the city of Toledo, to the east is the Cebu Strait, and to the south is the town of Minglanilla.

Talisay is 10 kilometres (6.2 mi) from Cebu City, the provincial capital.

=== Barangays ===
Political map of Talisay

Talisay is politically subdivided into 22 barangays. Each barangay consists of puroks and some have sitios.

PSGC	Barangay	Population			±% p.a.	
		2024		2010		
072250019	Biasong	2.5%	6,482	5,542	▴	1.09%
072250001	Bulacao	4.8%	12,697	11,579	▴	0.64%
072250002	Candulawan	1.7%	4,379	3,812	▴	0.97%
072250020	Camp IV	1.3%	3,305	2,258	▴	2.68%
072250003	Cansojong	6.1%	16,016	12,645	▴	1.65%
072250004	Dumlog	6.7%	17,785	12,709	▴	2.36%
072250005	Jaclupan	3.3%	8,684	7,891	▴	0.67%
072250006	Lagtang	5.2%	13,830	10,394	▴	2.00%
072250007	Lawaan I	3.6%	9,413	9,503	▾	−0.07%
072250021	Lawaan II	2.3%	6,033	5,625	▴	0.49%
072250022	Lawaan III	4.6%	12,037	10,708	▴	0.81%
072250008	Linao	3.8%	10,110	7,951	▴	1.68%
072250009	Maghaway	2.7%	7,148	6,869	▴	0.28%
072250010	Manipis	0.9%	2,456	1,994	▴	1.45%
072250011	Mohon	4.1%	10,735	9,582	▴	0.79%
072250012	Poblacion	4.8%	12,756	12,107	▴	0.36%
072250013	Pooc	4.4%	11,699	8,912	▴	1.90%
072250014	San Isidro	5.2%	13,753	12,502	▴	0.66%
072250015	San Roque	6.9%	18,161	16,950	▴	0.48%
072250016	Tabunok	5.6%	14,682	17,593	▾	−1.25%
072250017	Tangke	5.2%	13,707	11,891	▴	0.99%
072250018	Tapul	0.7%	1,777	1,755	▴	0.09%
	Total		263,832	200,772	▴	1.91%

=== Climate ===
Climate data for Talisay
Month	Jan	Feb	Mar	Apr	May	Jun	Jul	Aug	Sep	Oct	Nov	Dec	Year
Mean daily maximum °C (°F)	28 (82)	29 (84)	30 (86)	31 (88)	31 (88)	30 (86)	30 (86)	30 (86)	30 (86)	29 (84)	29 (84)	28 (82)	30 (85)
Mean daily minimum °C (°F)	23 (73)	23 (73)	23 (73)	24 (75)	25 (77)	25 (77)	25 (77)	25 (77)	25 (77)	25 (77)	24 (75)	23 (73)	24 (75)
Average precipitation mm (inches)	70 (2.8)	49 (1.9)	62 (2.4)	78 (3.1)	138 (5.4)	201 (7.9)	192 (7.6)	185 (7.3)	192 (7.6)	205 (8.1)	156 (6.1)	111 (4.4)	1,639 (64.6)
Average rainy days	13.4	10.6	13.1	14.5	24.2	27.9	28.4	27.7	27.1	27.4	22.5	15.9	252.7
Source: Meteoblue (modeled/calculated data, not measured locally)

== Demographics ==
Population census of Talisay
Year	Pop.	±% p.a.
1903	13,636	—
1918	15,302	+0.77%
1939	20,077	+1.30%
1948	22,442	+1.25%
1960	31,097	+2.76%
1970	47,787	+4.38%
1975	55,738	+3.13%
1980	69,720	+4.58%
1990	97,955	+3.46%
1995	120,292	+3.92%
2000	148,110	+4.56%
2007	179,359	+2.68%
2010	200,772	+4.19%
2015	227,645	+2.42%
2020	263,048	+3.09%
2024	263,832	+0.07%
Source: Philippine Statistics Authority

In 2017, Talisay City was the most densely populated city in the Cebu province. This ranking does not include highly urbanized cities: Cebu City, Lapu-Lapu, & Mandaue. There were 5,710 people living per square kilometer.

Cebuano is the predominant language of the inhabitants of the city (96%).

=== Religion ===
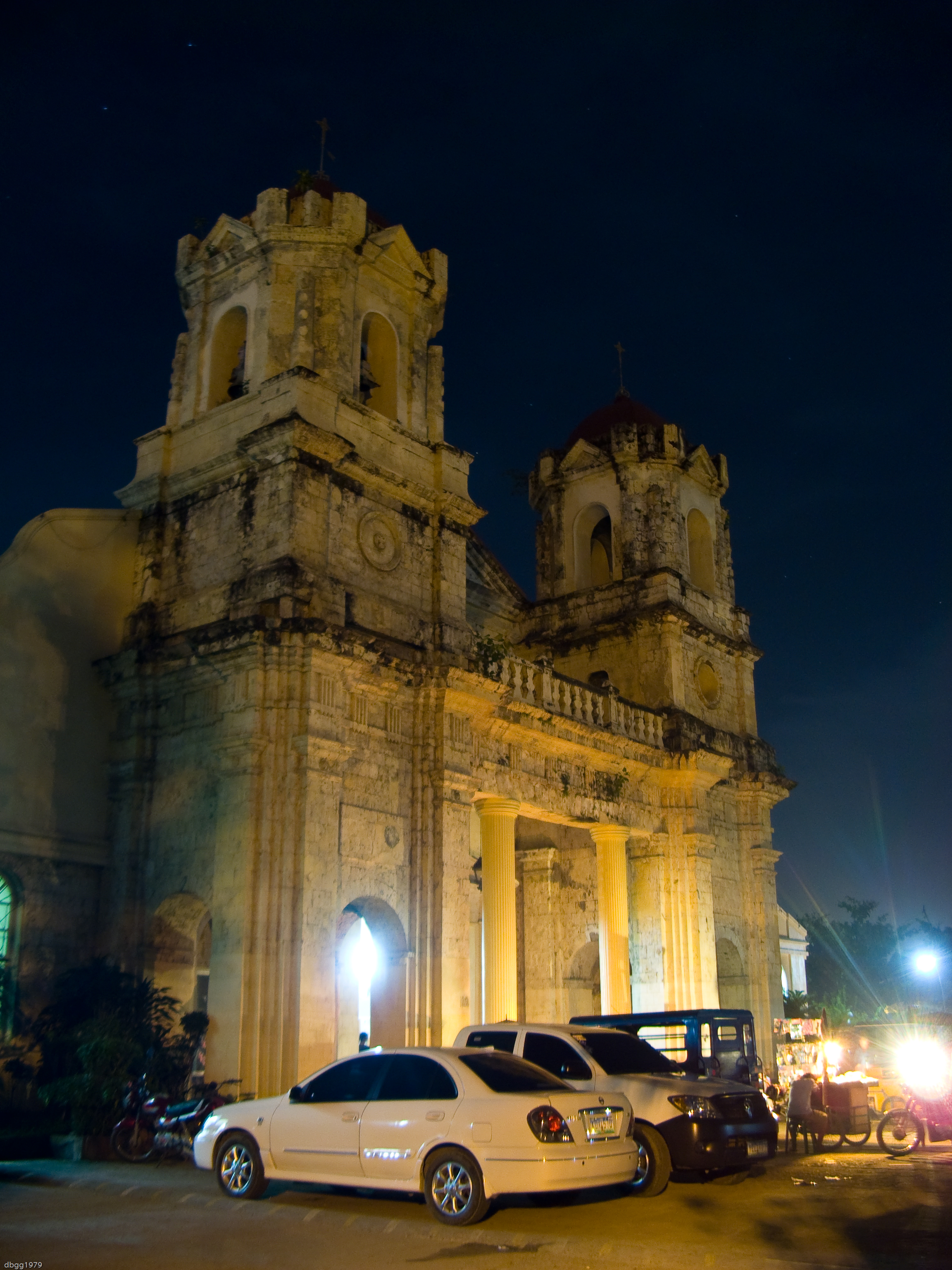
Santa Teresa Church

Talisay City has a Roman Catholic majority population. It also has sizeable Protestant and non-Christian minorities.

== Economy ==
Poverty incidence of Talisay (%)

Source: Philippine Statistics Authority

As of 2005, Talisay remains an important center for the production of blasting caps used in dynamite.

Much of the commerce in Talisay takes place in the Tabunok area, where several public markets, strip malls, and commercial establishments are situated. The biggest mall is Gaisano Grand Fiesta Mall Tabunok, which has a supermarket, department store, and formerly, a cinema. However, much of the population still depend on the public markets, where they can find fresh meat, fish and vegetables, as well as other household needs. There are many sari-sari stores. Talisay City and the Tabunok area also serve as the commercial area for municipalities south of the city, being the southern gateway to Cebu City.

== Culture ==
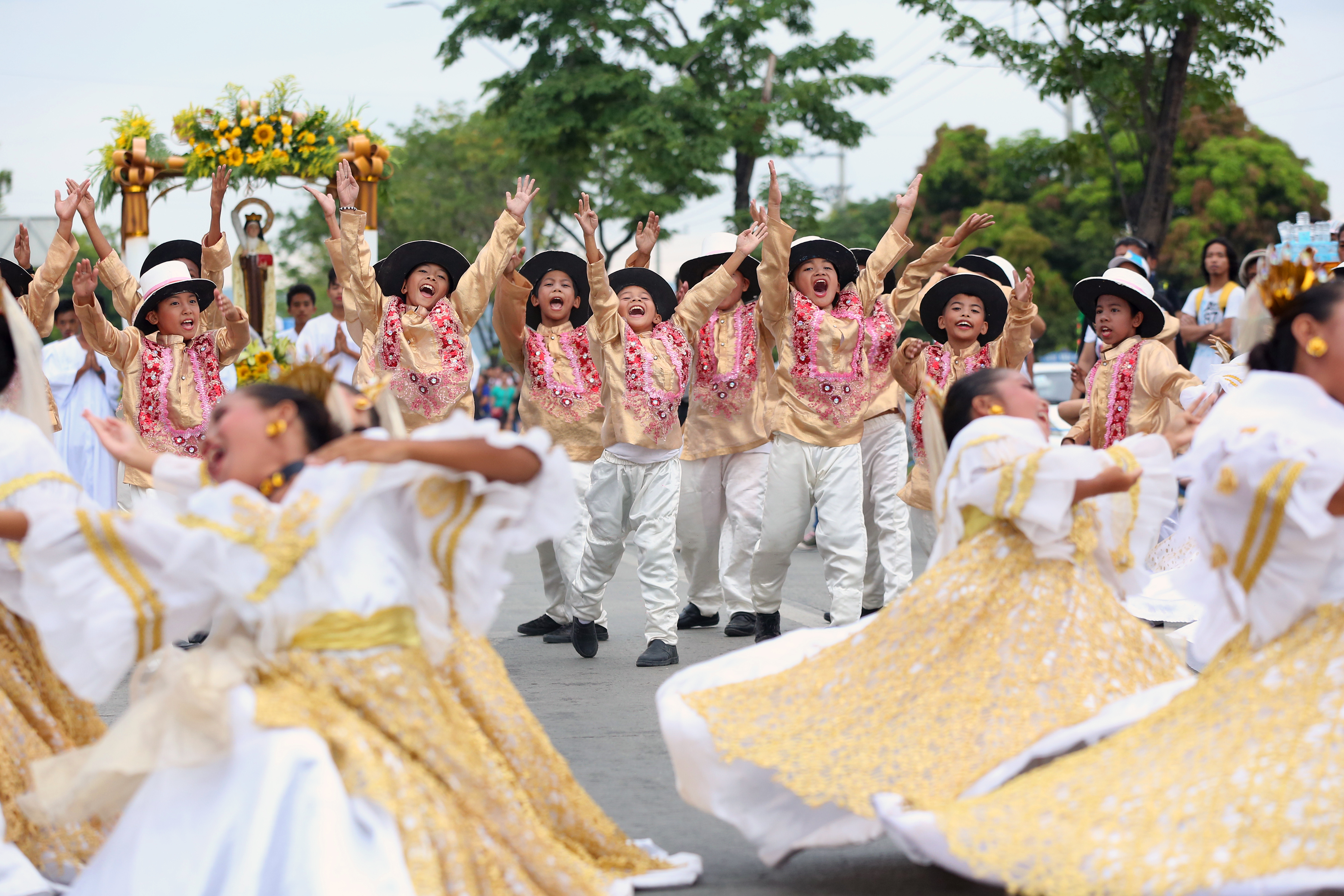
Native Talisaynon during their Halad Inasal Festival

Talisay City is considered the "Lechon Capital of Cebu" and is considered one of the two places to get the best of the best Lechon, which is nicknamed "Inasal", in Cebu, with the other place being Carcar.

Because of their Lechon, the town decided to create a religious-cultural festival to promote Talisay City, which was "Halad Inasal Festival" and celebrated on October 15. The festival is in honor of St. Teresa of Avila, Talisay City's patron saint, and is highlighted by street dancing merged with a procession with roasted pig, which then culminates with a ritual showdown and a grand finale with a firework display.

== Transport ==
Talisay City has benefited from the construction of the South Road Properties and the road that traverses it, the Cebu South Coastal Road, which is a six-lane coastal highway from downtown Cebu City to the city's Barangay Lawa-an I, near its border with the town of Minglanilla, with several exits in between, many of which serve several areas of Talisay. Because of this highway, traffic, which has always been a problem for the inhabitants in the past few years for this area, has been greatly reduced, making the city a popular zone for housing once more, as it was in the early 70s and 80s.

The city is also set to be served by the Cebu Bus Rapid Transit, wherein it will have two (2) feeder lines, going to Mambaling and to the South Road Properties, both located in Cebu City.

In 2016, the Talisay city council expressed support for the proposed Light Rail Transit (LRT) project in Cebu.

== Education ==
- 20 Elementary schools (Private & Public)
- 12 Public secondary schools
- 8 Private secondary schools
  - Divino Amore Academy (1993) Mohon, Talisay City
  - St. Scholastica’s Academy—Tabunok (1965) Tabunok, Talisay City
- 3 Colleges
- 5 Kindergartens
- 5 Seminaries

== Sources ==
- Gonzales, Glenda R. (December 2004). "Metro Cebu: A Metropolitan Area in Need of Coordinative Body" (PDF). Discussion Paper. 2004-49. Philippine Institute for Development Studies. Archived from the original (PDF) on March 10, 2016.
- Sun Star Cebu, Justin K. Vestil (August 5, 2016). "LRT system gets backing of Talisay council". Archived from the original on August 6, 2016.
