= Elizabeth Mall (Cebu City) =

Shopping mall in the Philippines

- E-Mall
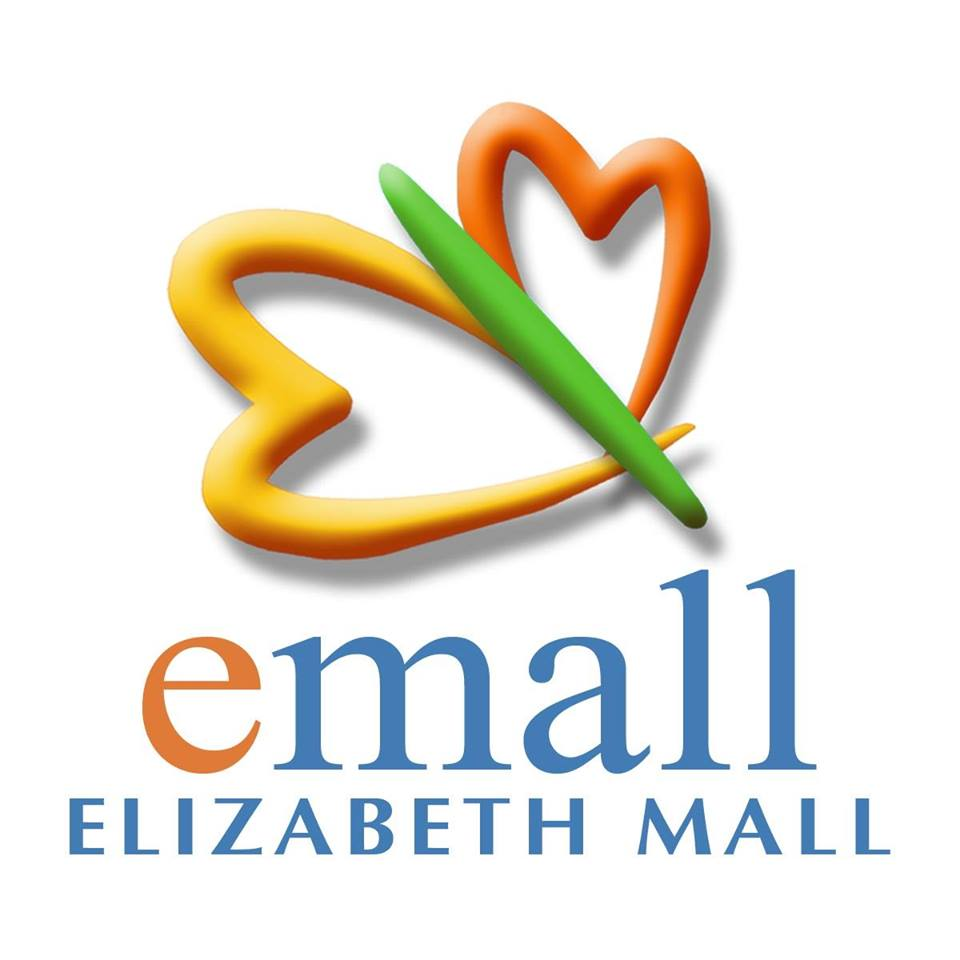
- Location: Cebu City
- Coordinates: 10°17′53″N 123°53′43″E
- Address: N. Bacalso Avenue corner Leon Kilat Street, Cebu City
- Opened: December 3, 2003; 22 years ago
- Developer: Cebu Central Realty Corporation
- Manager: Elizabeth Gan-Go
- Owner: Augusto W. Go
- Num. of stores: 200+
- Floors: 4
- Public transit: 01C Private; 01K Urgello; 02B Pier; 04C Camp Lapu-Lapu—Lahug; 04D 04I Plaza Housing—Lahug; 09F Basak, Pardo; 10F 10H 10M Bulacao, Pardo; 12D 12I Labangon; 17C 17D Apas; C Il Corso-SM Seaside-Jones-Ayala-IT Park; Future: CBRT South Bus Terminal
- Website: https://www.elizabethmall-cebu.com/

Elizabeth Mall, commonly known as E-Mall, is a shopping mall located in Cebu City, Philippines. It is owned by Atty. Augusto W. Go, Chairman of the Board & President of Cebu Central Realty Corporation who also owns University of Cebu and College of Technological Sciences–Cebu. It also calls itself as the "Shopping Center of the South".

== History ==
Located at N. Bacalso Avenue corner Leon Kilat Street in Brgy. Pahina Central, Cebu City, the lot that E-Mall stands today used to be a vacant lot where formations of citizens' military trainings were held.

The mall opened on December 3, 2003 and specifically caters to the classes A, B, C and D market, as well as to the students and young professionals. It was a gift of Atty. Augusto W. Go to his wife, Elizabeth Gan-Go, for whom the mall was dedicated, during their 33rd wedding anniversary.

In 2014, E-Mall opened its service lane as part of its rezoning strategies to be a one-stop shop in Cebu. It occupies almost half of the mall's third level. The site used to be the previous location of the World of Fun and the mall's activity center, which was then converted into a kiddie play area.

== Incidents ==
=== Accidental firing of service firearm ===
On March 30, 2009, a security guard wounded three persons when he accidentally fired his service firearm yesterday noon outside E-Mall. Abraham Duran, a member of the Unisave Security Specialist Agency, said he was trying to remove the magazine of his 9mm service pistol when it suddenly went off. The bullet stuck the ground and Geraldine Consul together with her 10-year-old son, David who had just been about to enter the mall, were hit by shrapnel. Jason Keesey Lureñana, who was standing nearby, was also grazed in the right arm and was taken to the mall’s clinic.

=== Death of delivery man ===
On October 17, 2016, a delivery man of Airspeed Philippines Inc. died after he was crushed by the cargo elevator in E-Mall. The body of Juan Amistad Udto was crushed while he was loading goods onto the cargo elevator from the fourth floor of the mall. He was brought to the St. Vincent Hospital but was declared dead on arrival by the attending physician at St. Vincent’s Hospital. He died due to "cervical contortion".

=== Fastfood outlet fire ===
On March 5, 2020, a Mang Inasal food outlet inside the mall caught fire. The fire alarm was received by responding firefighters at around 4:45 PM and was placed under control at around 5:11 PM.
