= Cebu Bus Rapid Transit System =

Mass transit system in the Philippines

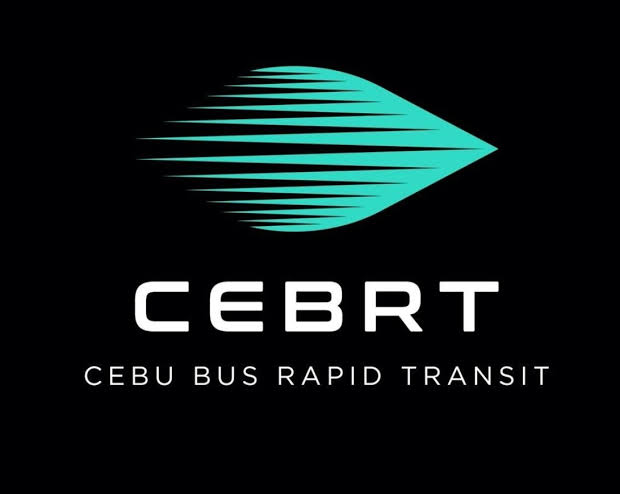

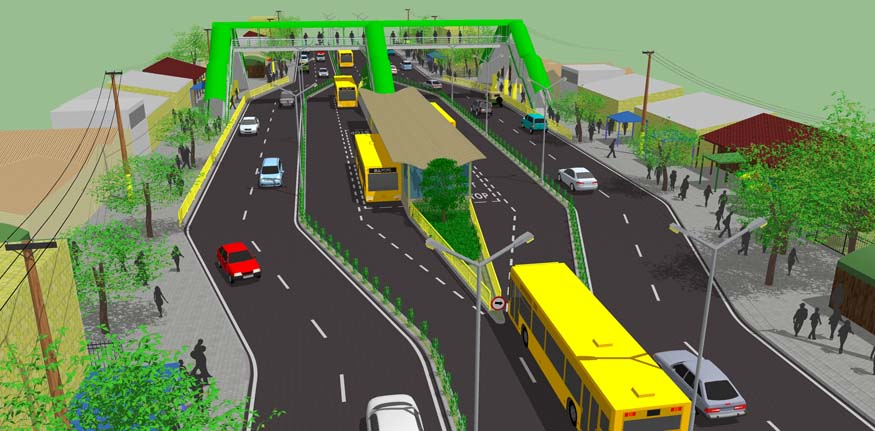
- Proposed BRT running ways down middle of road with median stations.

Overview
- Owner: Department of Transportation (DOTr)
- Area served: Metro Cebu
- Locale: Cebu City, Philippines
- Transit type: Bus rapid transit
- Number of lines: 1 (1st phase)
- Number of stations: 17 (1st phase)
- Daily ridership: 160,000 (forecast)
- Website: Facebook

Operation
- Operation will start: March 13, 2026 (partial); 2027 (full operations)
- Number of vehicles: 17

Technical
- System length: 13.6 km (8.5 mi)
- Average speed: 25.6 km/h (15.9 mph) (estimated)

The Cebu Bus Rapid Transit System (branded as CEBRT) is a partially-operational mass transit system in Cebu City, Philippines. It is the second operational bus rapid transit project in the Philippines, after the EDSA Carousel in Metro Manila. Only one line has been planned and partially built in detail so far, but scheme developers note the potential to develop a larger network comprising the adjacent cities of Lapu-Lapu, Mandaue, and Talisay, all of which, together with Cebu City, form part of the Cebu metropolitan area.

The project has faced numerous delays since its supposed implementation in 2016, from disagreements in the route alignments. The COVID-19 pandemic and Typhoon Rai (local name Odette) that hit Cebu also contributed to the delays in the project. However, the project finally broke ground on February 27, 2023, and was initially scheduled to be fully operational by the second quarter of 2025, with partial operations were eyed as early as the second quarter of 2024. As of 2026, however, full operations were declared to be targeted for late 2026, with the additional phases still under planning. After several postponements, partial operations for the Cebu BRT finally began on March 13, 2026._{.}

Upon completion, the Cebu BRT's initial 13-kilometer route, stretching from the South Road Properties (SRP) to the Cebu IT Park, is expected to serve up to 60,000 passengers daily. The project is supported by the World Bank and the French Development Agency (AFD), and is being implemented under the Department of Transportation’s Cebu Integrated Intermodal Transport System.

== History and development ==
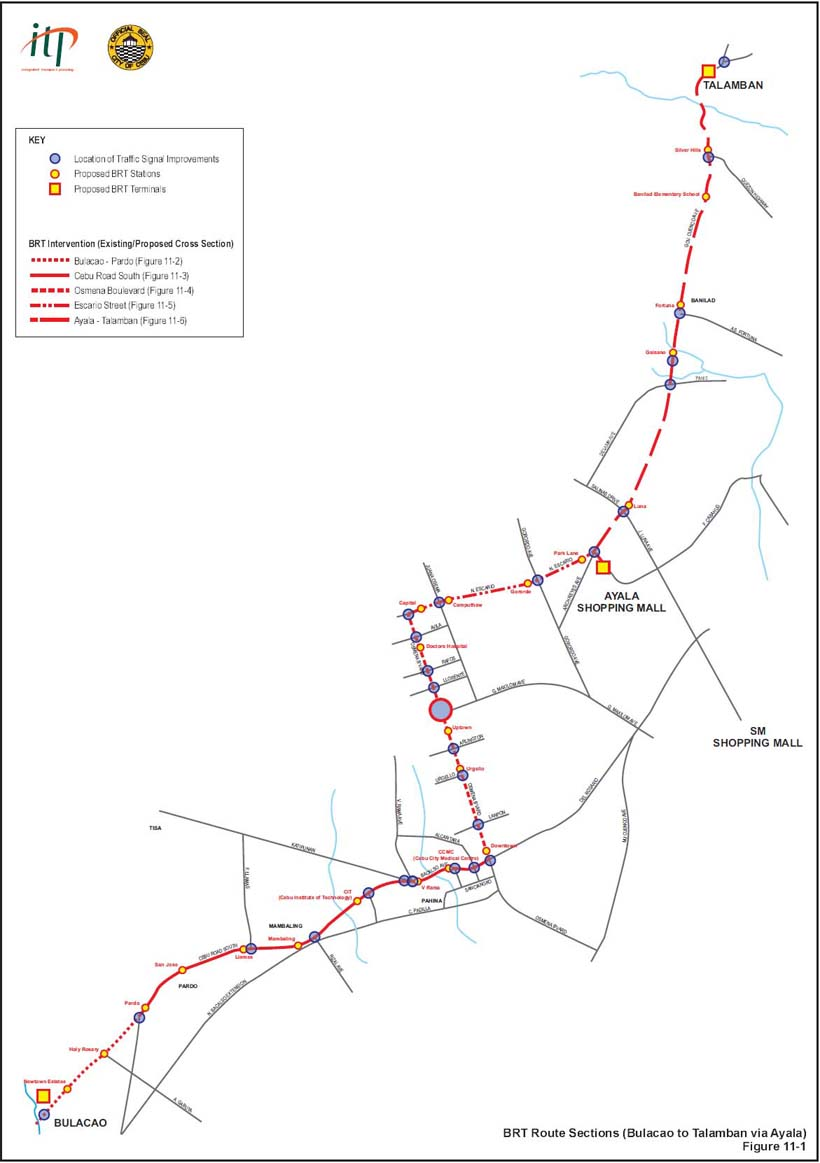
The old proposed path of Cebu BRT Line 1 and its suggested stations. The old route ran from Bulacao in southern Cebu City to Ayala Center Cebu. A feeder route to Talamban in northern Cebu City was also included in the proposal.

A bus rapid transit system for Cebu City was first proposed by former city mayor Tomas Osmeña in the 1990s, drawing inspiration from the Rede Integrada de Transporte in Curitiba, Brazil. However, it was only in 2010 when the Department of Transportation and Communications (DOTC) began formal planning. The World Bank is supporting the scheme financially and technically through its Clean Technology Fund. The Philippine national government initially disapproved the project, but later it supported the project financially as then-President Benigno S. Aquino III placed it as a priority project to purse, through a public-private partnership. The former Mayor of Cebu City, Michael Rama, is also supportive of the plans and has formed two steering committees to advise on policies and provide technical expertise. The Cebu City Team is headed by former Cebu City Councilor Nestor Archival, as the former Cebu BRT Project Development Officer, Engr. Nigel Paul Villarete, transferred to Mactan–Cebu International Airport on 26 October 2010.

A full feasibility study was commissioned by the World Bank Integrated Transport Planning Ltd in September 2012. This study defined the infrastructure, stations, vehicles and operational plan as well as requirements for a citywide Area Traffic Control system and improvements to the urban realm. A large public consultation scheme was undertaken during this study which engaged directly with 5,000 Cebuanos as well as communication via newspapers, TV, radio and social media. After the feasibility study, areas affected by road right of way (RROW) or road widening were marked with varying measurements ranging from less than a meter to 13 meters. Those with BRT stations have larger RROWs. The RROW is also expected to displace many houses and establishments and remove more than 2,000 roadside trees.

The Cebu BRT was formally approved by the Philippine National Economic and Development Authority (NEDA) on May 29, 2014. The project was supposed to be funded by a ₱10.6 billion ($228.5-million) funding package, consisting of a World Bank loan of $116 million (₱6.4 billion), $25 million from the World Bank Clean Technology Fund, and €50.89 million from the French Development Agency (AFD), with the balance to be provided by the Philippine government. In 2017, the budget for the project was revised to ₱16.3 billion, in accordance to Republic Act 10752, also known as "The Right-of-Way Act", meant to give just compensation to lot owners affected by the project.

The Cebu Interim Bus Service (CIBUS) (operated by Vallacar Transit) was launched in 2020 to provide a modern bus transport service to Cebu City, and was also aimed to mimic the Cebu BRT while it was still being formally planned and worked on. CIBUS runs largely the same route as the Cebu BRT, from South Road Properties to Cebu IT Park.

Following numerous delays since its supposed implementation in 2016, the Cebu BRT finally broke ground on February 27, 2023 in a ceremony attended by President Bongbong Marcos, Cebu City mayor Michael Rama, and Cebu governor Gwendolyn Garcia.

After several delays, partial operations for the Cebu BRT began on March 13, 2026, to mixed feelings from commuters. This meant that the BRT buses plying their routes from SRP to Cebu IT Park and vice versa have to run in mixed-traffic sections along roads where the infrastructure for the BRT hasn't been built yet. According to Cebu City Councilor Winston Pepito, BRT passengers reportedly thought that buses could stop anywhere on the route, similar to public utility vehicles (PUVs) or jeepneys. A passenger asked to disembark after missing his stop at Cebu Normal University (CNU), only to be told by the conductor that they can only disembark at BRT stations. The passenger later disembarked at the next stop, frustrated that the Cebu BRT did not serve its purpose. Despite these issues, some passengers remarked that the trip from Il Corso in SRP to Cebu IT Park was smooth and faster than the regular mixed-traffic buses. A commuter remarked that it took about 36 minutes on a BRT bus from Natalio Bacalso Avenue to the Cebu IT Park.

== Route ==
The Cebu BRT route consists of a main line spanning 13.18 km (8.19 mi) of segregated lanes with 17 stations, one depot, and one trunk terminal from South Road Properties in southern Cebu City to the Cebu IT Park in northern Cebu City. The main line will traverse several important thoroughfares of Cebu City, including Natalio Bacalso Avenue, Osmeña Boulevard, and N. Escario Street. A feeder line system with a total length of 22.1 km (13.7 mi) will support the main line. The feeder lines will run over mixed traffic with priority for the buses, with two feeder terminals in Talisay and Talamban in northern Cebu City.

Upon completion, the Cebu BRT will traverse Cebu City and Talisay with a total of 76 bus stops across the system. There is also provision to extend the Cebu BRT system into the other cities and municipalities of the province of Cebu.

According to the Philippine Department of Transportation, the Cebu BRT can serve 60,000 passengers in a day for the first year of operations. Once the system is fully operational, the Cebu BRT system can cater a total of 160,000 passengers. For the first year of operation, 83 buses will ply the Cebu BRT routes, while a total of 144 buses will serve the system by 2038.

The original route for the Cebu BRT had 11 km (6.8 mi) of segregated busways from Bulacao in southern Cebu City to Ayala Center Cebu, and a further 6 km (3.7 mi) of bus priority at junctions to reach Talamban along Governor M. Cuenco Avenue. A spur line to the SRP was also part of the plan.

== BRT terminal and stations ==
The BRT stations are four meters wide and 83 meters long. The BRT first phase from Bulacao to Ayala consists of 15 symmetric and asymmetric stations.

Cebu Normal University BRT Station at Osmeña Blvd.

== Branding ==
TransCebu is the proposed name for the BRT line. Single deck non-articulated buses which hold between 85 and 110 passengers will be used. A running speed of 25 km/h is proposed with a peak frequency of 75 buses per hour on the core route. This operation is expected to carry 330,000 passengers each day. However, in 2023, the branding name CEBRT was revealed during the groundbreaking ceremony of the first phase.

== Ticketing and fare collection ==
Fares will likely be collected through the use of prepaid smart cards. The pre-feasibility assessment for the BRT route states that if the fares were charged at the same level as jeepneys, ticket revenues could reach US$15 million per year, of which US$1.5 million is expected to be the profit or surplus.

== Costs and benefits ==
The pre-feasibility study estimates that in comparison to using jeepneys the BRT route will save passengers 570 million hours of travelling per year and will also be cheaper for the bus operators as BRT vehicles are cheaper to run than the existing jeepneys. The overall cost benefit ratio has been evaluated to be 2.45.

If the buses were to run on diesel then the route is estimated to save 9,655 tonnes of PM_{10} emissions and 1.6 million tonnes of CO_{2} emissions up to the year 2035. However the DOTC is also considering running the vehicles on LPG, biofuel, hybrid or electricity, which will reduce emissions further.

== Expansion ==
The full BRT network for Metro Cebu could cover Talisay, Cebu City, Mandaue, and Lapu-Lapu City, the four largest cities of Metro Cebu. The Cebu BRT is also eyed to pass through the South Road Properties (SRP), and a direct connection to Mactan–Cebu International Airport (MCIA) is also a part of the plan in the near future. There could also be a BRT network at downtown Cebu especially at Colon Street.

== Criticism ==
The narrow roads of Cebu City has been a point of criticism for the project. Arizona State University professor Donald Webster claimed that a BRT system in Cebu was not viable due to the city's narrow roads, suggesting instead that the project should be reimagined as a light rail or heavy rail system that could be built above or below the roads. This sentiment was also shared by Presidential Assistant for the Visayas Michael Diño, who stated that he would lobby to President Rodrigo Duterte to have the project scrapped in favor of a light rail transit system.

=== Legal issues ===
On March 20, 2024, Mayor Michael Rama filed an administrative complaint before the Office of the President and sought the suspension of Governor Gwen Garcia regarding the CBRT. "Garcia, by issuing the Assailed Memorandum, violated the Constitution, the Administrative Order 23, Series 1992, the Local Government Code, the Code of Conduct and Ethical Standards for Public Officials and Employees, and the Anti-Graft and Corruption Practices Act", Rama alleged. Garcia issued a memorandum to stop the CBRT construction in heritage buffer zones of the Cebu Provincial Capitol and Fuente Osmeña Circle on February 27, 2024.

=== Decision to open the BRT lanes to jeepneys ===
On March 18, 2026, amidst mounting complaints about traffic congestion from motorists and jeepney passengers since the first day of the BRT's operation, Cebu City Mayor Nestor Archival said that he was open to letting public utility jeepneys (PUJs) use the BRT lanes, as a temporary solution. The immediate implementation of this temporary solution was confirmed by Cebu City Transportation Office (CCTO) head Raquel Arce, who said that the jeepneys will also follow stricter loading and unloading protocols similar to the BRT buses already running on them. The following day, this shared-lane setup received criticism from netizens and motorists because it only further undermines the BRT's very purpose. Archival has defended the temporary solution, citing a shortage of buses and long headways. He also stated that the temporary solution will also help train jeepney drivers and commuters to follow stop-based loading and unloading. The Cebu City government elaborated on the temporary solution a few days later saying that only 17 of the 30 BRT buses were currently running, reiterating the presence of mixed-traffic sections, and pending feeder routes.

== See also ==
- EDSA Carousel
- Davao Public Transport Modernization Project
