= GV Tower Hotel =

Hotel in Cebu City, Philippines

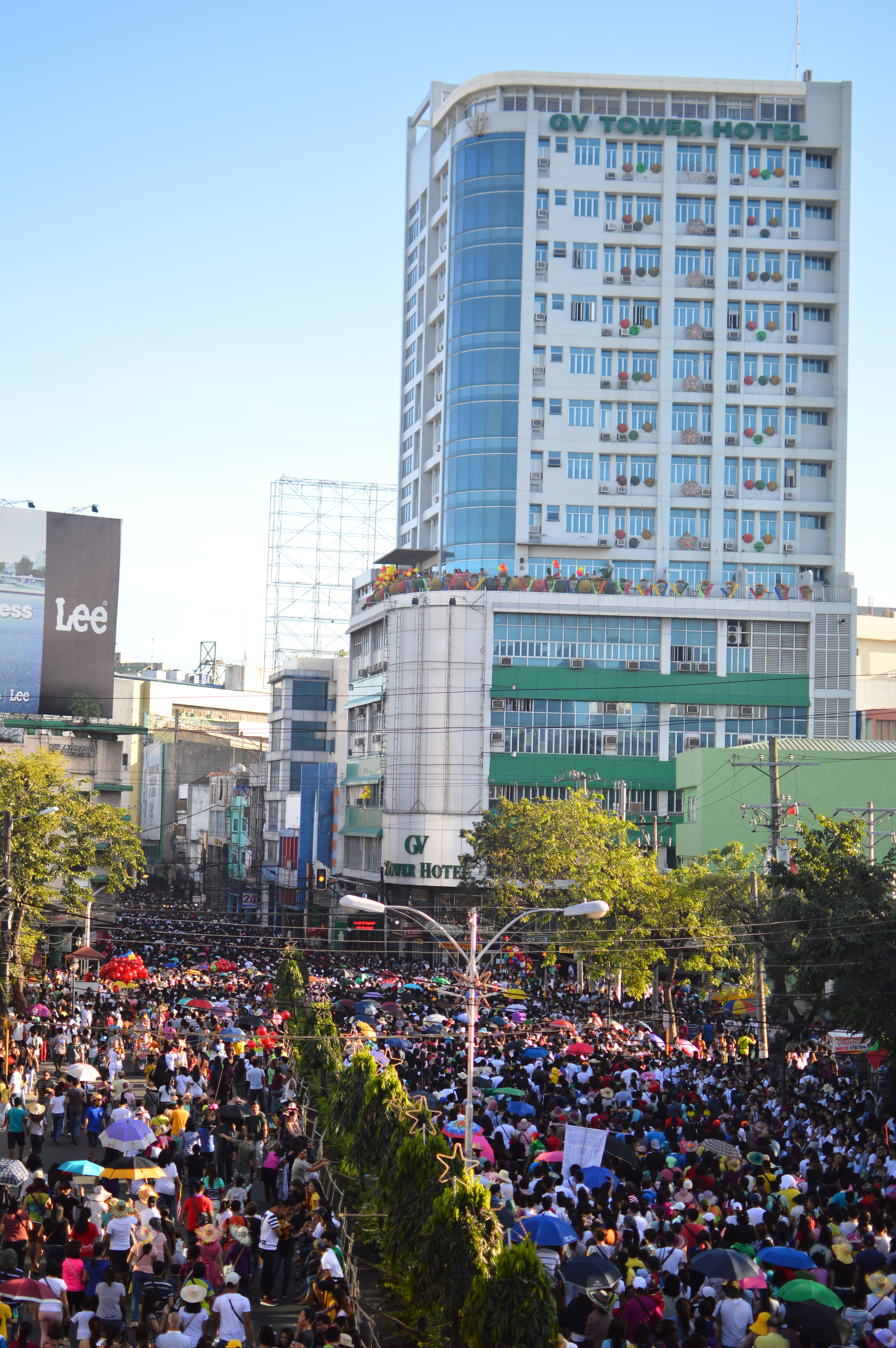
- Interactive map of the GV Tower Hotel area

General information
- Status: Completed
- Type: Hotel
- Location: Osmeña Boulevard corner Sanciangko Street, Cebu City, Philippines
- Coordinates: 10.2975°N 123.8973°E
- Construction started: 2004
- Owner: GV Hotels

Height
- Height: 59 m (193.57 ft)

Technical details
- Floor count: 16

Design and construction
- Developer: GV Hotel Group

Website
- www.gvhotels.com.ph

The GV Tower Hotel is a budget hotel in Cebu City, Philippines and part of the GV Hotel Group, which operates 22 budget hotels across the Visayas and Mindanao region. It was constructed in 2004.
