= Cebu City =

Highly-urbanized city in Central Visayas, Philippines

Cebu City Dakbayan sa Sugbo (Cebuano)
- Highly urbanized city
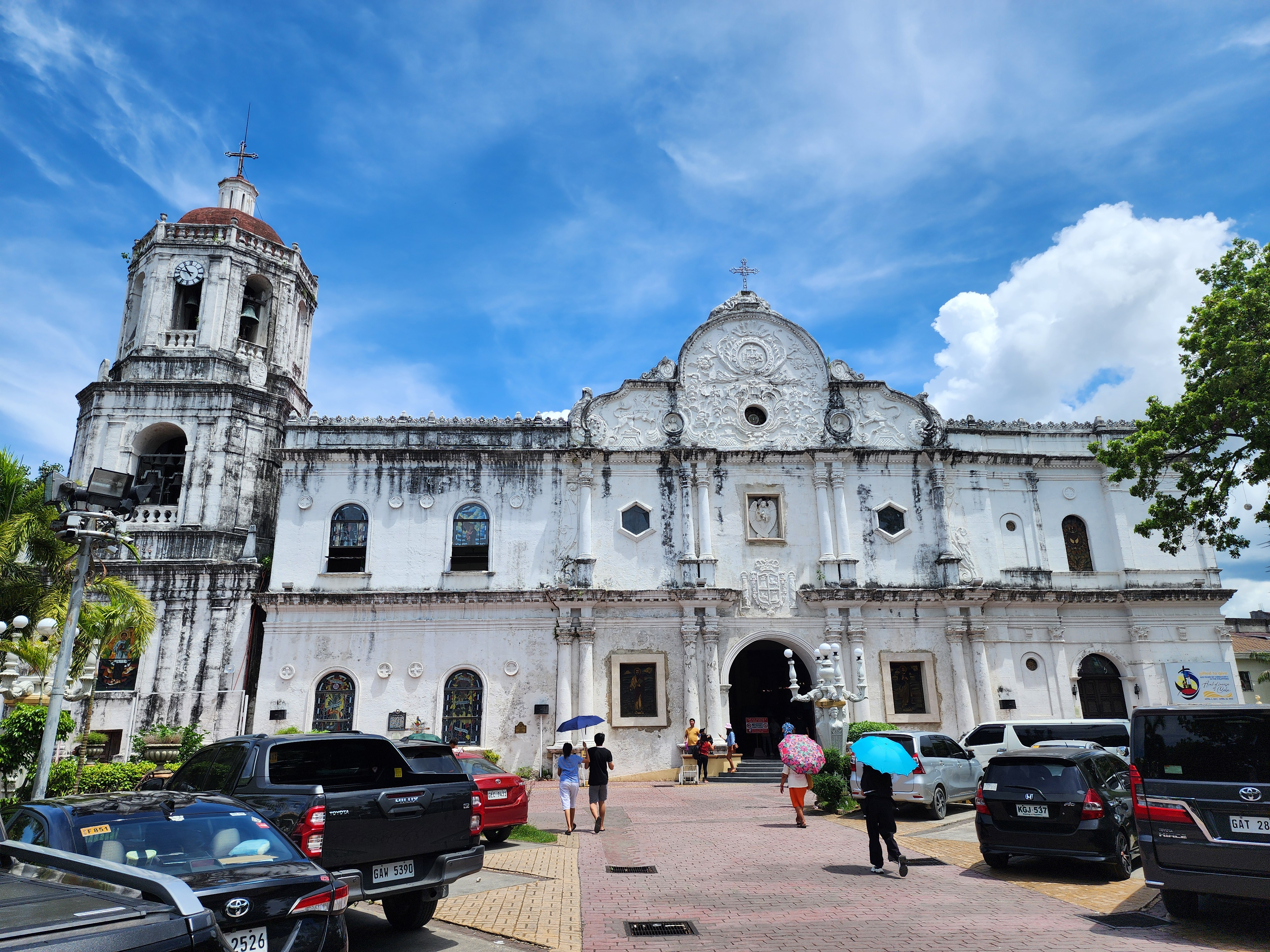
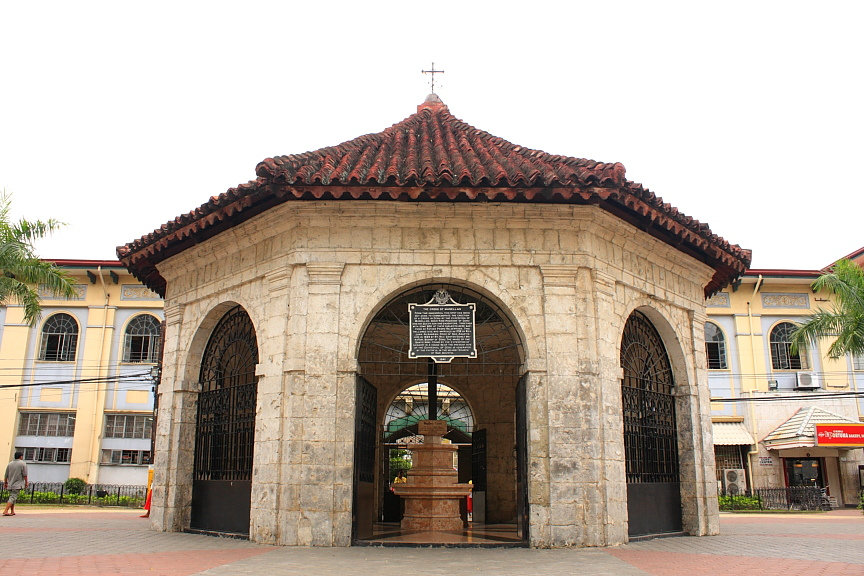
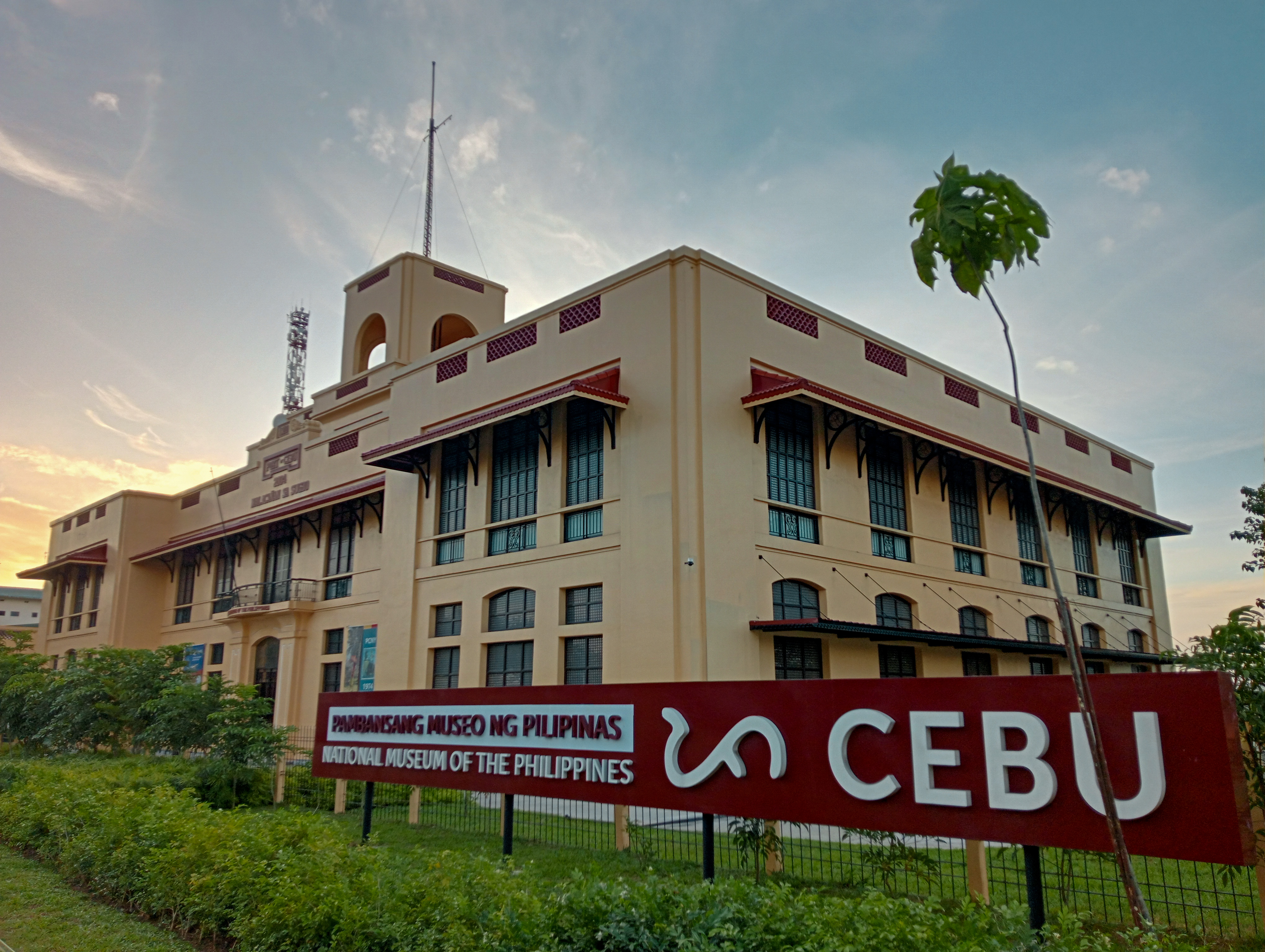
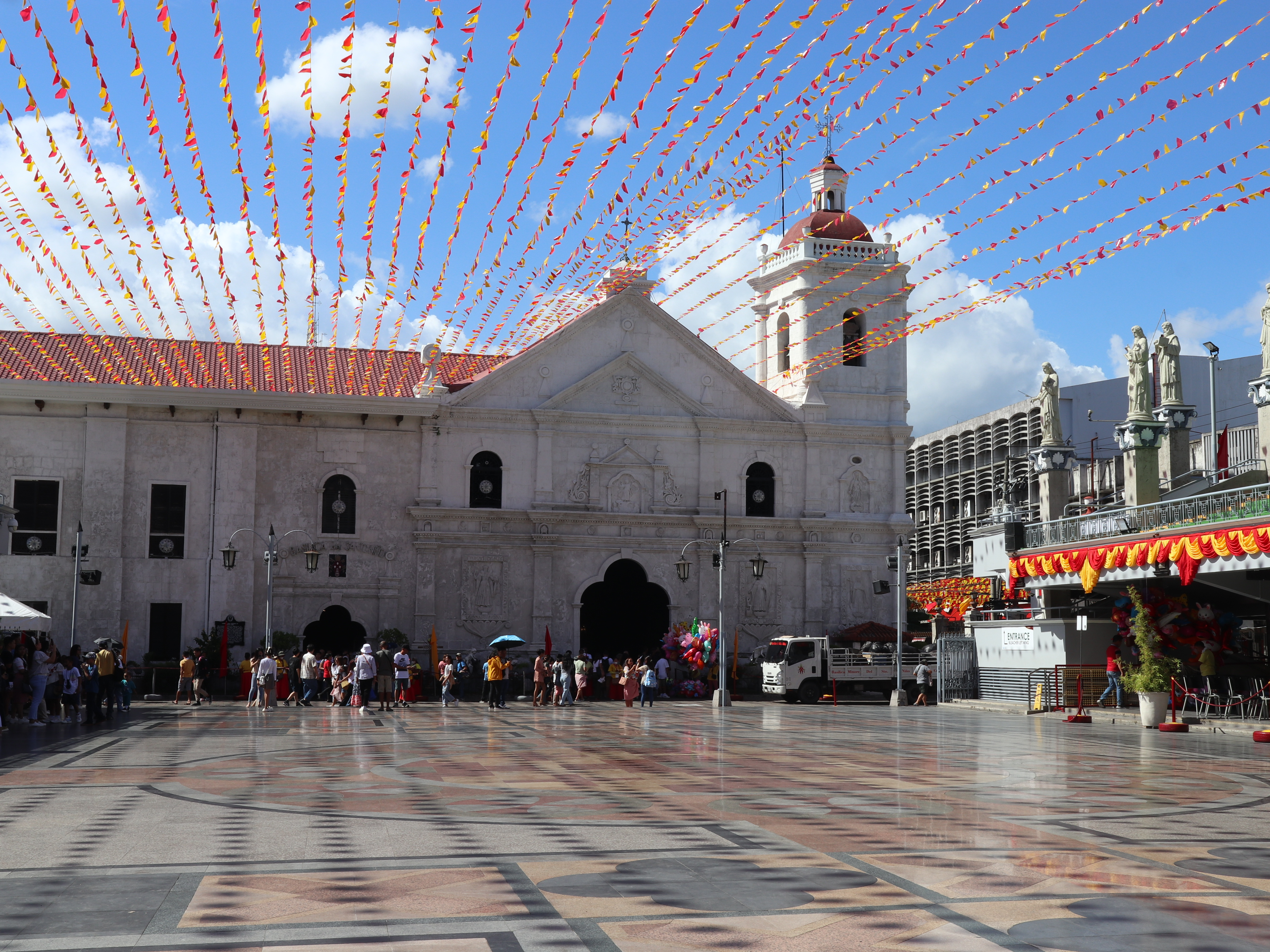
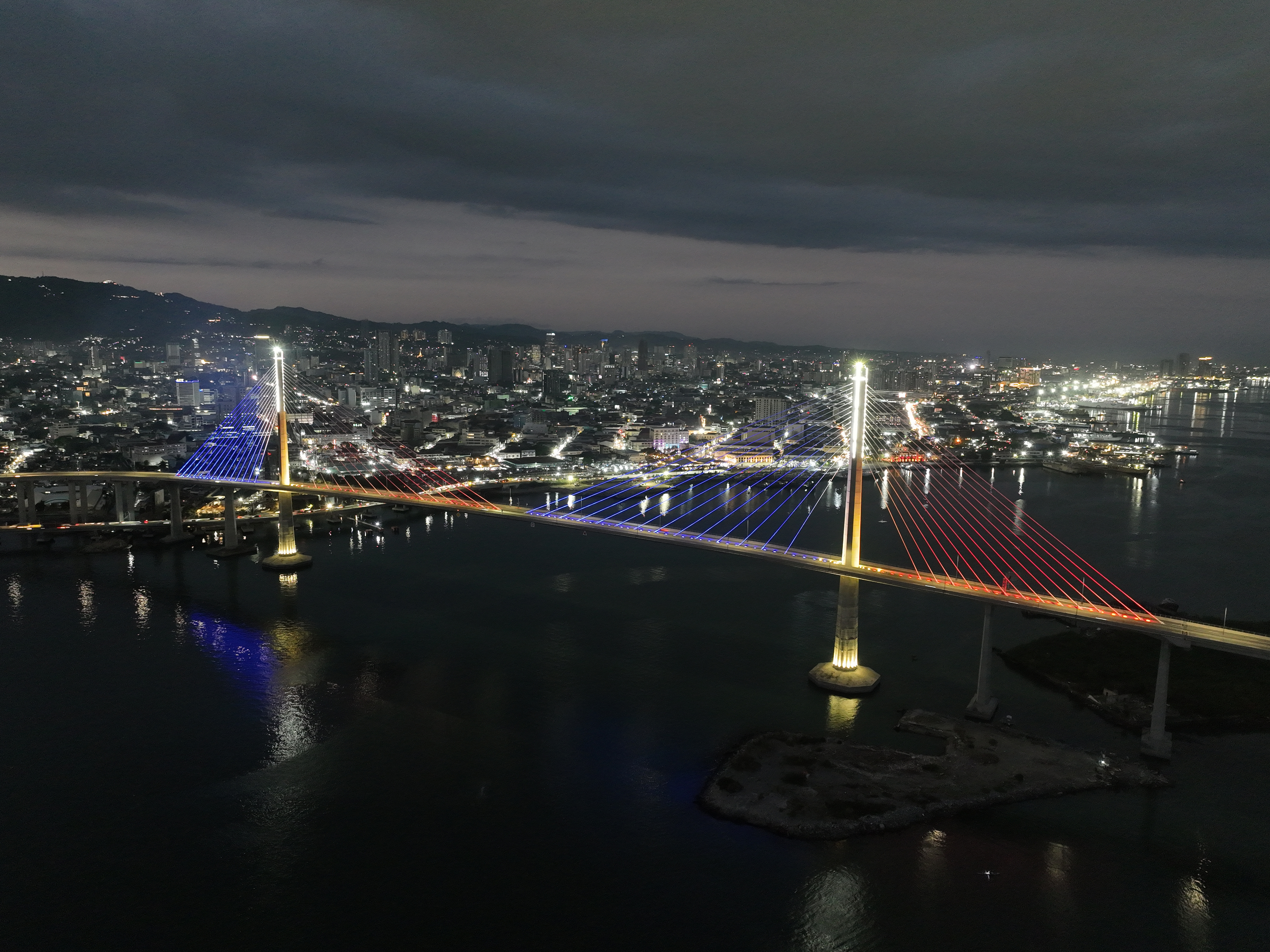
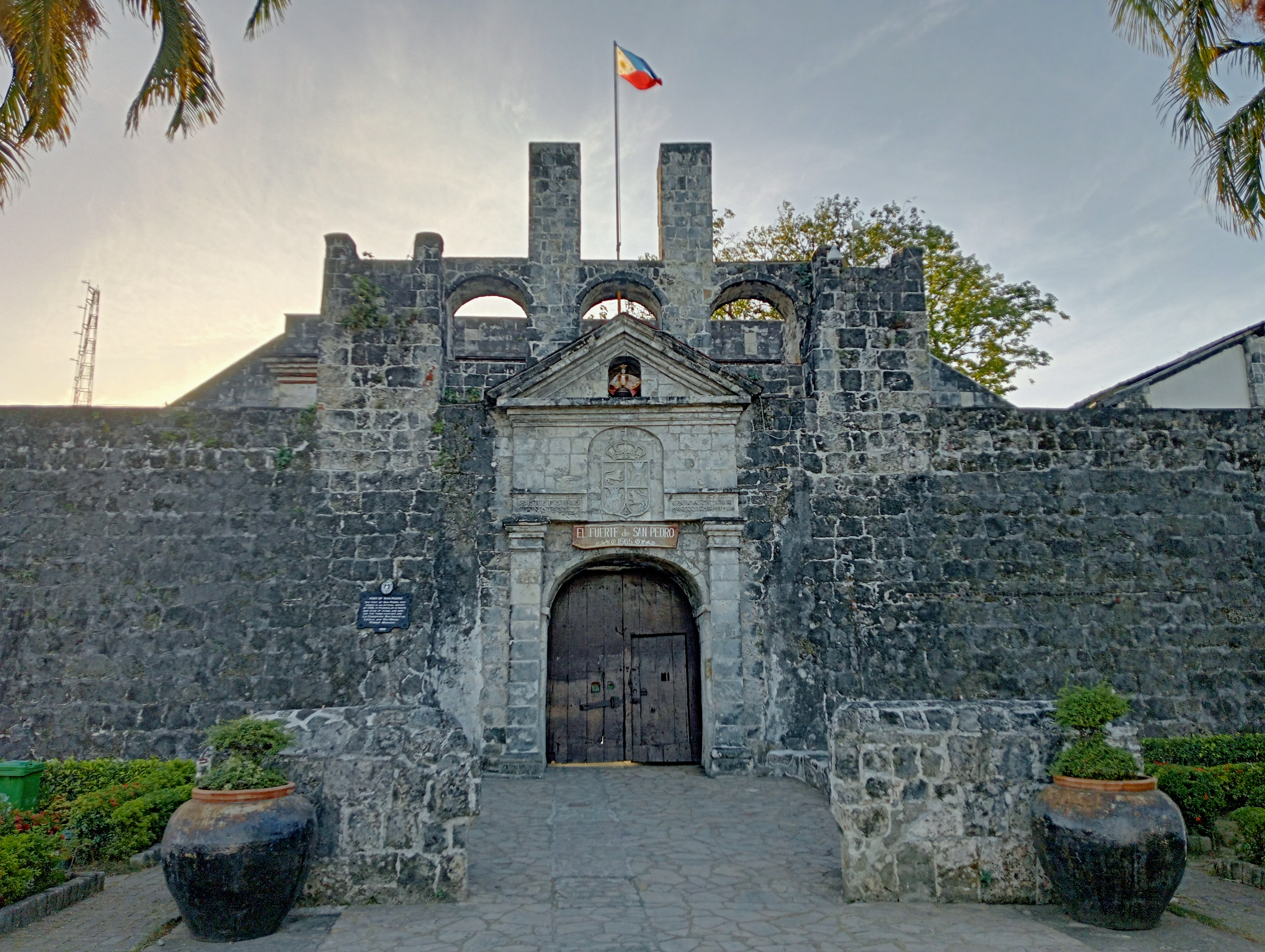
- Cebu Business Park viewed from The Cebu Exchange Cebu Metropolitan Cathedral Magellan's Cross National Museum of the Philippines – Cebu Basilica Minore del Santo Niño CCLEX at night Fort San Pedro

- Flag Seal Logo and wordmark
- Nicknames: Queen City of the South; Oldest City in the Philippines; First Capital of the Philippines; Creative Capital of the Philippines; and; Reggae Capital of the Philippines
- Anthem: Sugbuanon Ako "I am Cebuano"
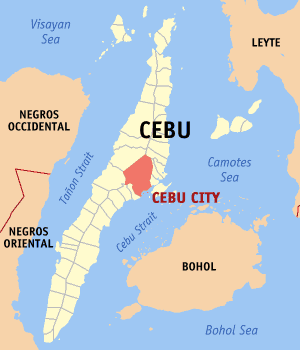
- Map of Central Visayas with Cebu City highlighted
- Interactive map of Cebu City
- Location within the Philippines
- Coordinates: 10°17′35″N 123°54′07″E
- Country: Philippines
- Region: Central Visayas
- Province: Cebu (geographically only)
- District: 1st (North) and 2nd (South) districts of Cebu City
- Founded (as Spanish colony) Reincorporated (as city): 1565 24 February 1937
- Highly urbanized city: December 22, 1979
- Barangays: 80 (see Barangays)

Government
  - Type: Sangguniang Panlungsod
  - Mayor: Nestor Dionson Archival (BOPK-LP)
  - Vice Mayor: Tomas R. Osmeña (BOPK-LP)
  - City Council: Councilors: Winston Pepito; Nice Archival; Joel Garganera; Edgardo Labella II; Harold Kendrick Go; Alvin Arcilla; Sisinio Andales; Jun Alcover Jr.; 1st District (North); Dave Tumulak; Jose Abellanosa; Phillip Zafra; Paul Labra; Francis Esparis; Mikel Rama; Michelle Abella; Harry Eran; 2nd District (South)
  - Congress: Representatives: 1st LegDist (North); Rachel del Mar (NPC); 2nd LegDist (South); Eduardo Rama Jr. (Lakas); Commission on Elections
  - Electorate: 721,469 voters (2025)

Area
  - City: 315.00 km^{2} (121.62 sq mi)
  - Urban: 205 km^{2} (79 sq mi)
  - Metro: 1,062.88 km^{2} (410.38 sq mi)
  - Rank: 34th out of 145
- Elevation: 34 m (112 ft)
- Highest elevation: 981 m (3,219 ft)
- Lowest elevation: 0 m (0 ft)

Population (2024 census)
  - City: 965,332
  - Rank: 6th
  - Density: 3,064.5/km^{2} (7,937.1/sq mi)
  - Urban: 2,454,000
  - Urban density: 12,000/km^{2} (31,000/sq mi)
  - Metro: 3,164,337
  - Metro density: 2,977.13/km^{2} (7,710.74/sq mi)
  - Households: 238,317
- Demonym: Cebuano

Economy
  - Gross domestic product (GDP): ₱334.48 billion (2024) $5.775 billion (2024)
  - Income class: 1st city income class
  - Poverty incidence: 7.6% (2023)
  - HDI: ▲0.845 (Very High)
  - Revenue: 9,258 million (2022)
  - Assets: 30,545 million (2022)
  - Expenditure: 10,555 million (2022)
  - Liabilities: 15,768 million (2022)

Service provider
  - Electricity: Visayan Electric Company (VECO)
  - Water: Metropolitan Cebu Water District (MCWD)
- Time zone: UTC+8 (PST)
- ZIP code: 6000
- PSGC: 072217000
- IDD : area code: +63 (0)32
- Sister cities: List: International; Busan, South Korea; Guadalajara, Mexico; Haarlemmermeer, Netherlands; Kaohsiung, Taiwan; Kortrijk, Belgium; Sabrosa, Portugal; Seattle, U.S; St Petersburg, Russia; Vladivostok, Russia; Xiamen, China; Yokohama, Japan; Yeosu, South Korea; Local; Butuan; Davao City; General Santos; Manila; Ozamiz
- Catholic diocese: Archdiocese of Cebu
- Website: cebucity.gov.ph

Cebu City, officially the City of Cebu, (Note: Cebuano: Dakbayan sa Sugbo (IPA: [d̪ɐk.bɐˌjan̪ s̪ɐ ˈs̪uɡ.bo]); Tagalog: Lungsod ng Cebu (IPA: [lʊn̪ˌsod̪ n̪ɐŋ sɛˈbu]); Spanish: Ciudad de Cebú (American Spanish: Spanish pronunciation: [sjuˌð̞að̞ ð̞e seˈβ̞u], European Spanish: Spanish pronunciation: [θjuˌð̞að̞ ð̞e θeˈβ̞u]) is a highly urbanized city in the Central Visayas region of the Philippines. According to the 2024 census, it has a population of 965,332 people, making it the sixth-most populated city in the country and the most populous in the Central Visayas Region and in the whole Visayas.

It serves as the capital of the Cebu province wherein it is geographically situated and grouped under the province by the Philippine Statistics Authority, but is one of three highly urbanized cities (together with Lapu-Lapu and Mandaue) that are administratively independent of the provincial government and also the largest city within that province. It also serves as the regional center of Central Visayas, and its metropolitan area exerts influence on commerce, trade, industry, education, culture, tourism, and healthcare beyond the region, over Central and Eastern Visayas and partly over Mindanao. It is the Philippines' main domestic shipping port and is home to about 80% of the country's domestic shipping companies. Additionally, Cebu City is the prime trading center of the southern Philippines.

Cebu City is bounded on the north by the town of Balamban and the city of Danao, on the west by the city of Toledo, on the east by the cities of Lapu-Lapu and Mandaue and the towns of Liloan, Consolacion and Compostela and to the south by the city of Talisay. Located at the center of the eastern seaboard of Cebu Island, it is the core city of Metro Cebu, the second largest metropolitan area in the Philippines, which includes the cities of Carcar, Danao, Lapu-Lapu, Mandaue, Naga and Talisay and the municipalities (towns) of Compostela, Consolacion, Cordova, Liloan, Minglanilla and San Fernando. Metro Cebu had a total population of 3,207,256 as of the 2024 census.

The current political boundaries of the city are an amalgamation of the former municipalities of Cebu, San Nicolas, El Pardo, Mabolo, Talamban and Banilad in the Commonwealth period.

The city has experienced rapid economic growth since the 1990s, a phenomenon also known as "Ceboom". Owing to its economic importance and influence in modern times, Cebu City is also popularly referred to as the Queen City of the South.

== Etymology ==
The modern name, Cebu, is a 16th–17th century Spanish pronunciation of the native name Sugbo and its early iterations are Zibu, Zebu, Zubu, Subuth, Çubu, and Sibu. The word sugbú in Cebuano means "to dive into water", and also in Tagalog, Hiligaynon, Aklanon, and Mansaka languages with more or less the same meaning. The name is derived from the Proto-Philippine word *sug(e)bu meaning "to wade into water". In Mateo Sanchéz's entry, he defines sugbu or sibu as "to put or place partially into the water" or "as someone stepping into water, but not totally".

As with most settlements in the Philippines whose common origin is either derived from an abundance of plants, for example, Manila and one of the most common names of cities in the Philippines, Talisay and settlements near a body of water, for example, Iloilo and the island of Mindanao. The Selden Map records the island known to the Ming dynasty as sokbu (束務), a Hokkien pronunciation of the name (in Mandarin Chinese "suwu"), in the early 17th century.

== History ==
=== Pre-Hispanic period ===
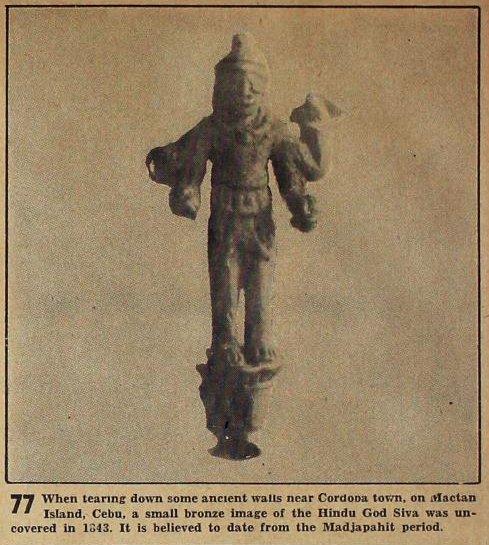
A picture of a Bronze Image of the Hindu god Shiva (lost during World War II), found in Mactan, demonstrating the area as having been Hindu and Indianized.

Very little is known about when the site was first settled prior to colonization, but artifacts have been discovered near the city, if not exactly at the site in what is now Cebu City dating back to at least the 14th to 15th centuries CE. Other geological and archaeological studies revealed that Cebu as a settlement began sometime during the 10th century. Though there are artifacts detailing the settlement of the island as early as 2000 BCE, the exact date of when the village was settled and named "Sugbu" is unknown, since prior to colonization most Visayans were illiterate up until the later half of the 16th century.

According to a new translation of ancient Chinese Annals: a kingdom called Suwu (束務) was mentioned in the 1225 work Zhu Fan Zhi (諸蕃志), and in the 17th century this was the same name used for Cebu among Chinese traders to the Philippines, thus, it is presumed to be the same location.

Cebu was referenced in association with Boni (Brunei) wherein it was written:

"The countries of Xilonggong (Sailunggung/Sailengkeng, possibly Selingaan Island), Shimiao (Simmiu/Simbio), Rili (Jatlai/Jitleh, possibly Jelai ), Hulumantou (Wulomantau/Holobantau), Suwu (Somat/Sobut), Lima (Leima/Libeh), Danyu (Damjyu/Tamu), and Manuo (Manok/Belok) are located on islands in the sea. Their people travel to and fro in small boats, and their clothing and diet are the same as those of Boni. They produce sheng agarwood, lakawood, beeswax, and tortoiseshell. Merchants can trade for these with white porcelain ware, wine, rice, coarse salt, white spun silk, and trade-quality gold."

— Zhao Rukuo

The book Zhinan Zhengfa (“The True Art of Pointing South) which had maritime logs compiled from 1471-1588 show maritime shipping lanes plying from the kingdom of Manila (کراجاءن مانيلا) to the Rajahnate of Cebu and that the Cebu Rajahnate's industries also specialized in local goods, mainly of: Seaweed, Iron Smithing, Terraced Rice, and Native Cotton.

During the Ming Dynasty, Chinese records categorized the inhabitants of Cebu and adjacent islands—notably Butuan, Samar, Leyte, Negros, Panay, and Northern Mindanao the collective ethnonym "Visayans," transcribed in contemporary sources as Pisheye. Scholarly interpretations suggest that the Pisheye territories were an alliance group of primarily low-lying coastal port kingdoms characterized by limited agricultural development, a geographical profile consistent with the topography of pre-colonial Cebu. Historical accounts further document the maritime prowess of these Visayan groups, noting their expansionist activities into Eastern Taiwan and from there, their persistent raids along the southeastern coast of China, specifically targeting the prefecture of Quanzhou and the coastal settlements of Shui’ao and Weito.

There is a popular myth that the city was supposedly founded by "Sri Lumay" and that the place was once "Kang Sri Lumayng Sugbo". However, the authenticity of this source is highly debatable and should not be taken seriously. There are no existing documents predating Spanish chroniclers that made a reference to the island, and there was no mention of the so-called "Sri Lumay". Fr. Francisco Ignacio Alcina's History of the Bisayan Islands does not even mention the epic or any reference to that person. Also, in the compilation of Spanish accounts by esteemed American historian specializing in Philippine history, William Henry Scott, there is no mention of any scorched earth tactics in Visayan warfare. It is likely then that the "legend" is an invention by Jovito Abellana. The supposed capital city, "Singhapala" (ᜐᜒᜅ᜔ᜑᜉᜎ), a localization of the Tamil-Sanskrit Singapura (சிங்கப்பூர்), same root-word as the City-State of Singapore, was also not mentioned as a capital city. Instead, Antonio Pigafetta, the Italian chronicler in Magellan's expedition, records "Cingapola" as a town, whose chiefs are Cilaton, Ciguibucan, Cimaninga, Cimaticat, and Cicanbul. Were it a rich city, it would be very unlikely to have been ignored by Pigafetta, and the absence of stone structures were not found nor erected before the late 16th to the 17th century.

Despite the smallness of the polity of Cebu it borrowed a considerable degree of Indo–Malay culture from more developed regional neighbors like Butuan, to which it had dynastic links since its ruler Rajah Siagu was a cousin of Rajah Humabon. This is also evident in the titles of native Cebuano nobility, as Chief Humabon (mistakenly identified as a "king" in Pigafetta's writings) was addressed by the Sanskrit title "Rajah". Rajah Tupas, who ruled Cebu in 1565, was descended from the brother of Rajah Humabon who was a "bendara" ("treasurer" or "vizier" in Malay), a clipping of the Sanskrit bendahara (भाण्डार, lit. "storage house").

=== Spanish period ===
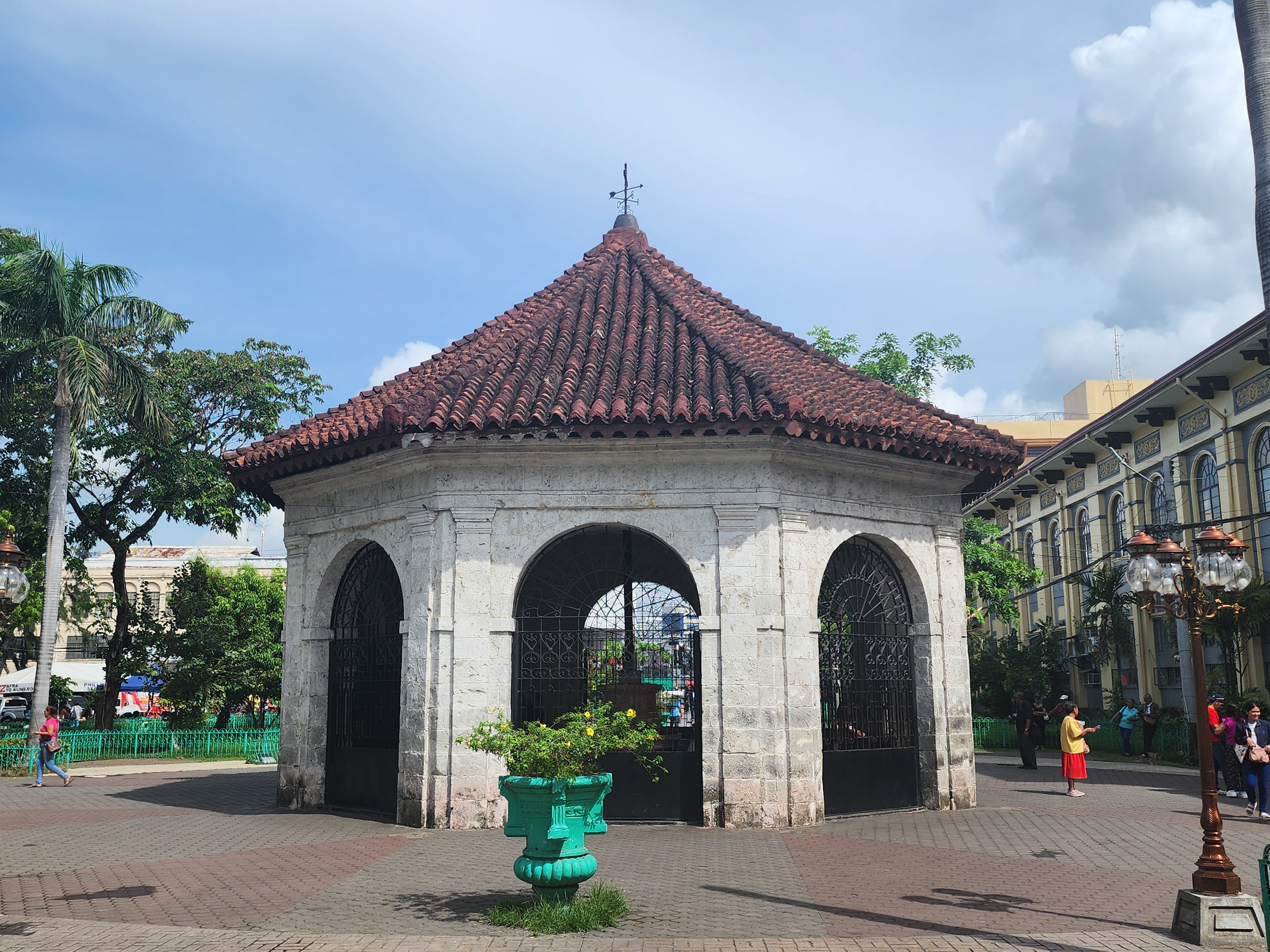
Magellan's Cross, which is said to be the cross planted by Ferdinand Magellan's expedition in 1521

On April 7, 1521, Portuguese explorer at the service of the Spanish Crown and leader of the first expedition to circumnavigate the world, Ferdinand Magellan, landed in Cebu. He was welcomed by Rajah Humabon. Magellan, however, was killed in the Battle of Mactan, and the remaining members of his expedition left Cebu soon after several of them were poisoned by Humabon, who was fearful of foreign occupation. The last ruler of Sugbo, prior to Spanish colonization, was Rajah Humabon's nephew, Rajah Tupas (d. 1565).

On February 13, 1565, Spanish and (probably some) Mexican conquistadors led by Miguel López de Legazpi together with Augustinian friars whose prior was Andrés de Urdaneta, left New Spain (modern Mexico) and arrived in Samar, taking possession of the island thereafter. They Christianized some natives and Spanish remnants in Cebu. Afterwards, the expedition visited Leyte, Cabalian, Mazaua, Camiguin and Bohol where the famous Sandugo or blood compact was performed between López de Legazpi and Datu Sikatuna, the chieftain of Bohol on March 16, 1565. The Spanish arrived in Cebu on April 15, 1565. They then attempted to parley with the local ruler, Rajah Tupas, but found that he and the local population had abandoned the town. Rajah Tupas presented himself at their camp on May 8, feast of the Apparition of Saint Michael the Archangel, when the island was taken possession of on behalf of the Spanish Crown. The Treaty of Cebu was formalized on July 3, 1565, and López de Legazpi's party named the new city Villa de San Miguel de Cebú (later renamed Ciudad del Santísimo Nombre de Jesús). In 1567, the Cebu garrison was reinforced with the arrival of 2,100 soldiers from New Spain (Mexico). (Note: On orders of the King Philip II, 2,100 men arrived from Mexico.) The growing colony was then fortified by Fort San Pedro, and aside from Mexican soldiers, the city was founded by 80 colonists from Spain. Asides from these Mexican Mestizos and pure Spanish Europeans, around 400 Native American Tlaxcalans were also part of the conquest of Cebu and were given pensions. The Philippines hosts the only architectural and cultural styles in Asia that were founded by Latin Americans and Anglo Americans. Yet despite being a most unique tourism destination among Asians for the American and Latino influences not available anywhere else in the continent, as the other Asian nations were colonized by Europeans instead, the number of tourists going to the Philippines from their Asian neighbors are negligible. Whereas in contrast, the Philippines is a top source of tourists going to its Asian neighbors.

By 1569, the Spanish settlement in Cebu had become important as a safe port for ships from Mexico and as a jumping-off point for further exploration of the archipelago. Small expeditions led by Juan de Salcedo went to Mindoro and Luzon, where he and Martín de Goiti played a leading role in the subjugation of the Kingdoms of Tundun and Seludong in 1570. One year later, López de Legazpi departed Cebu to discuss a peace pact with the defeated Rajahs. An agreement between the conquistadors and the Rajahs to form a city council paved the way for the establishment of a new settlement and the construction of the Christian walled city of Intramuros on the razed remains of Islamic Manila, then a vassal state of the Sultanate of Brunei.

In 1571, the Spanish carried over infantry from Mexico, to raise an army of Christian Visayan warriors from Cebu and Iloilo as well as mercenaries from the Tagalog region and assaulted the Sultanate of Brunei in what is known as the Castilian War. The war also started the Spanish–Moro Wars waged between the Christian Visayans and Muslim Mindanao, wherein Moros burned towns and conducted slave raids in the Visayas islands and selling the slaves to the Sultanates of the Malay Archipelago and the Visayans fought back by establishing Christian fort cities in Mindanao, cities such as Zamboanga City. On August 14, 1595, Pope Clement VIII created the diocese of Cebu as a suffragan to the Archdiocese of Manila. There were 5 Conquistadors from Latin America that were given encomiendas in the region of Cebu. First was Adelantado Miguel Lopez de Legaspi, leader of the expedition from Mexico, he was given a large encomienda of an unknown number of Filipino tributaries. Next, is Jerónimo de Monzón, whose number of tributes was also not specifically cited. Cristóbal Sánchez, was mentioned next, with 3000 native Cebuano tributes, followed by Francisco Carreño with about 2000 Cebuano tributes. Afterwards, Andrés de Mirandaola with 1,000 tributes which are also in Cebu, and finally Pedro Arana, whose precise number of tributes are not specifically quantified. All of these Mexican conquistadors were given lands and encomiendas in and around the region of Cebu. The years 1603, 1636, 1670, and 1672 saw the deployment of 86, 50, 135, and 135 Latin American soldiers from Mexico to Cebu. In 1608, Maguindanaoans raided Carigara on the island of Leyte to the east, so Cebu under Commander Salgado led an expedition of 70 Spanish and 60 Kapampangan marines that had intercepted and destroyed them. On January 6, 1635, Juan de Alcarazo, the alcalde mayor of Cebu, ordered a force of 50 Spanish and 1,000 Visayan troops, to battle rebels who caused unrest in Bohol. On April 5, 1635, Cebu sent a force of 300 Spanish and 1,000 Visayan troops to settle and colonize Zamboanga City under the command of Captain Juan de Chávez. In the 1700s, Cebu province housed 625 Spanish Filipino families and 28,112 native families. And in 1818, the new census showed that downtown Cebu (Cebu city, alone, centered in Fort San Pedro, excluding other cities in Cebu Province) had 233 Spanish-Filipino families, the Parián (Chinatown) of Cebu which was also another separate city had another set of 109 Spanish-Filipino families, Mandaue City also had 20 Spanish-Filipino families, Danao City to the north, had 57 Spanish-Filipino families, Barili had 14 Spanish-Filipino families, and Samboan to the farthest south had 69 Spanish-Filipino families, and finally Bantayan Island which was also under the jurisdiction of Cebu, had 75 Spanish-Filipino families. When adding the other islands that were also politically under Cebu such as Siquijor, Bohol, Dauis, and Camotes Island, the total number of Spanish-Filipino families increased from 625 in the 1700s to 631 in 1818.

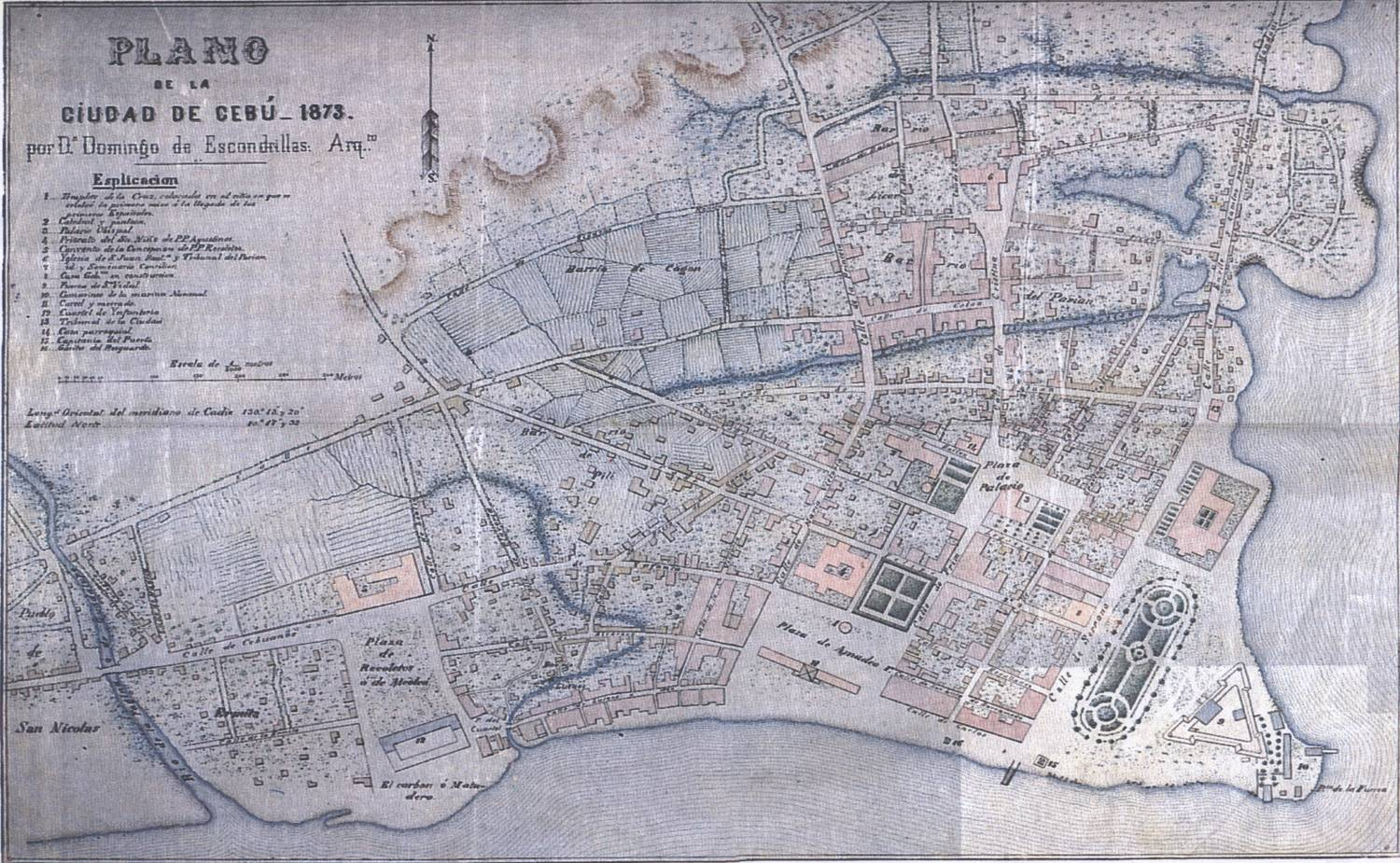
A 19th-century map of Cebu City

On April 3, 1898, local revolutionaries led by the Negrense León Kilat rose up against the Spanish colonial authorities and took control of the urban center after three days of fighting. The uprising ended with the treacherous murder of Kilat and the arrival of soldiers from Iloilo and Manila. On December 26, 1898, the Spanish Governor, General Montero, evacuated his troops to Zamboanga, turning over government property to Pablo Mejía. The next day, a provincial government was formed under Luis Flores as president, General Juan Clímaco as military chief of staff, and Julio Llorente as mayor.

=== American occupation and World War II ===
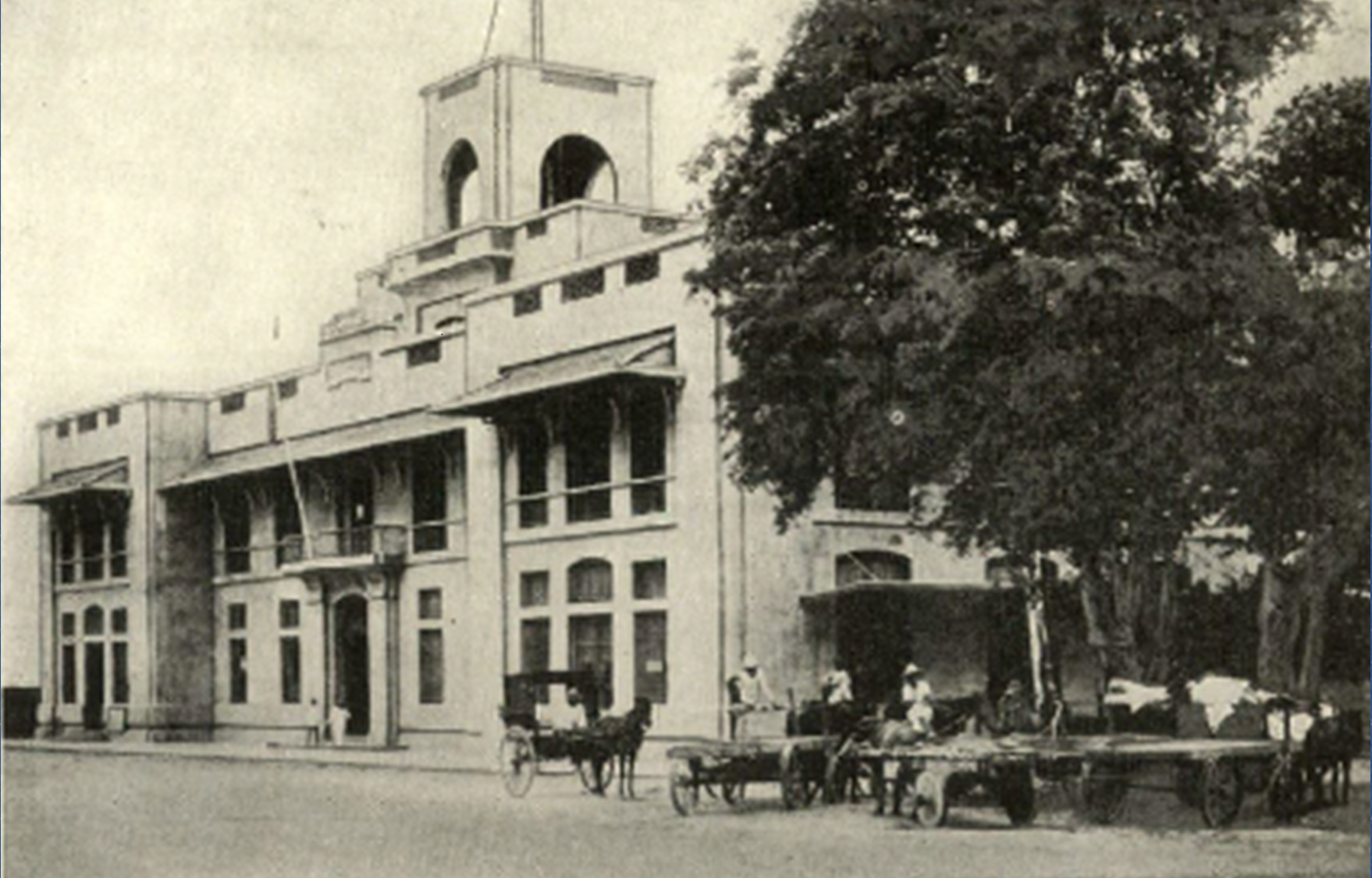
Aduana (customs) building in 1910, now known as the National Museum of the Philippines – Cebu

The signing of the Treaty of Paris at the end of the Spanish–American War provided for the cession of Cebu along with the rest of the Philippines to the United States until the formation of the Commonwealth. On February 21, 1899, the USS Petrel (PG-2) deployed a landing party of 40 marines on the shores of Cebu. Cebu's transfer to the American government was signed by Flores although others, most notably General Arcadio Maxilom and Clímaco, who offered resistance until 1901. Governor-General William H. Taft visited Cebu on April 17, 1901, and appointed Llorente as the first provincial governor. Clímaco was elected to that office in January 1904.

==== Cityhood ====
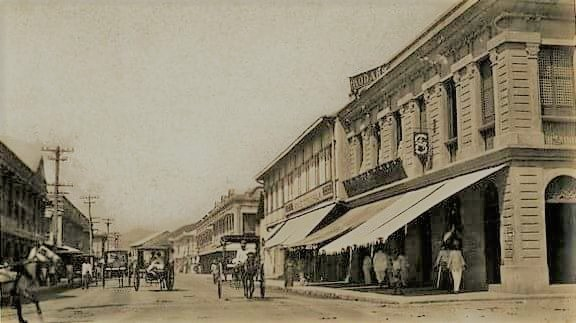
Calle Magallanes

With its city status granted by the King of Spain in 1594 invalidated by the change of colonial administration, in 1934 the neighboring municipalities of El Pardo, Mabolo, Talamban, Banilad, and San Nicolás were dissolved and merged to become the revived City of Cebu, which received its renewed official Charter on February 24, 1937. These former towns were broken up into several barangays, including their town centers which assumed their names (in contrast, Manila and Iloilo preserved their incorporated towns as geopolitical districts) resulting this in expansion of its territory. Many other Philippine cities such as Dansalan (now Marawi), Iloilo City, and Bacolod were also incorporated at the same time (see Cities of the Philippines). Alfredo V. Jacinto was serving as mayor when the city's status was restored by law.

==== Japanese occupation ====
Along with the rest of the country, Cebu came under Japanese occupation of the Philippines during World War II. The Japanese encountered the local resistance movement, comprising guerrillas and irregular troops led by Colonel James Cushing and the Cebu Area Command. A Japanese businessman established Cebu's first "comfort station" during the war, where Japanese soldiers routinely gang-raped, humiliated, and murdered kidnapped girls and teenagers who they forced into sexual slavery under the brutal "comfort women" system. It was finally liberated with the Battle for Cebu City in March and April 1945. The military general headquarters of the Philippine Commonwealth Army and 8th Constabulary Regiment of the Philippine Constabulary, active from January 3, 1942, to June 30, 1946, were stationed in Cebu City during World War II.

=== Post-war years ===
The war virtually razed Cebu City to the ground, but reconstruction was rapid. The city's central business district, which had been confined largely to the coast and the area around the port before the war, had expanded inland. Colon Street, the oldest national road in the Philippines, which was once a residential area in the pre-war years, became the center of a dense and compact area in downtown Cebu City, becoming home to many shopping and business activities, including the city's most fashionable shops, restaurants, and movie houses. In 1962, construction of the Cebu City North Reclamation Area commenced, finishing eventually in 1969, which expanded the port of Cebu and provided the city with more developable land close to the city center. During this time, Cebu also became a prominent educational center for the Visayas and Mindanao regions, and new schools were established in Cebu's uptown areas, such as the Talamban campus of the University of San Carlos.

=== During the Marcos dictatorship ===
Cebu became a key center of resistance against the Marcos dictatorship, first becoming apparent when the hastily put-together lineup of Pusyon Bisaya defeated the entire slate of Marcos' Kilusang Bagong Lipunan (KBL) in Region VII.

Among the Cebuanos immediately arrested by the Marcos dictatorship with the declaration of martial law on September 23, 1972, were columnist and future National Artist Resil Mojares and human rights lawyer and Carcar Vice Mayor Demócrito Barcenas, who were both detained at Camp Sergio Osmeña.

Among the Marcos regime desaparecidos from Cebu was Redemptorist priest Fr. Rudy Romano, a prominent Marcos critic and executive secretary of Cebu's Coalition against People's Persecution, who was accosted by armed men in Tisa, Labangon on June 11, 1985, and never seen again. Levi Ybáñez, Romano's colleague in the Coalition against People's Persecution, was abducted on the same day as Fr. Romano, and remains missing.

Later, Cebu would play a key role in the days leading up to the 1986 People Power Revolution and the ouster of Marcos. It was from Fuente Osmeña Circle in Cebu City that the opposition forces relaunched a civil disobedience campaign against the Marcos regime and its cronies on February 22, 1986. After that, the Carmelite Monastery in Barangay Mabolo served as a refuge for opposition candidates Corazon Aquino and Salvador Laurel on the first day of the revolution, as it was not yet safe for them to return to Manila.

=== Economic boom and contemporary history ===
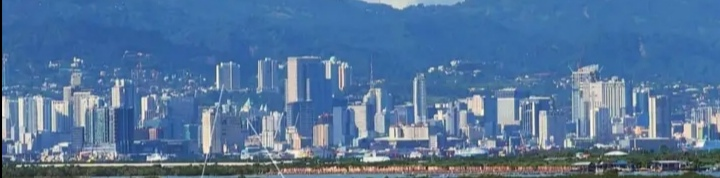
Panoramic view of the Cebu skyline

In 1990, Typhoon Ruping (international name: Mike) hit Visayas and Cebu in particular, causing considerable damage to the infrastructure of the city and province. The typhoon cut the city's communication lines, leaving it isolated and causing delays in aid from the national government in Manila. This forced local authorities to rethink priorities, and enforced radical measures such as rationing food, water, and fuel. The city quickly recovered, and by the end of the decade, was experiencing rapid economic growth dubbed "Ceboom." This also spread economic growth to its neighboring cities and municipalities, which spreads from Danao from the north all the way to Carcar to the south.

Within the city, economic growth was observed in other areas as well, and much of the business activity shifted from the old and derelict downtown area to the more modern and more diverse business districts located in other areas of the city, including areas around Fuente Osmeña (colloquially known as "Uptown Cebu"), the Cebu Business Park, and the Cebu IT Park, among other areas. The opening of the aforementioned Ayala Mall and SM City Cebu had also shifted significant retail activities away from Colon, though it remained to serve as an important transit point for public utility jeepneys (PUJ) covering arterial routes within the city.

In 2002, the South Road Properties (SRP) was completed, initially with the intention of being a hub for light industries but gradually shifted to be a hub for mixed-use developments. The Cebu South Coastal Road, which traverses through SRP, has helped alleviate the city's traffic by serving as an alternative to the Natalio Bacalso Avenue. SM Seaside City Cebu opened in 2015, and was one of the largest shopping malls in the Philippines upon opening. The opening of the Cebu–Cordova Link Expressway in 2022, which links the city to Cordova in Mactan, is poised to unlock the SRP's potential as the city's next economic hub. Other infrastructure projects, such as the Metro Cebu Expressway and the Cebu Bus Rapid Transit System, are also in place to help facilitate the city's future growth.

== Geography ==
Cebu City has a land area of 315 square kilometers (122 sq mi). To the northeast is Mandaue City and the town of Consolacion; to the west is Toledo City and the towns of Balamban and Asturias; to the south is Talisay City and the town of Minglanilla.

Across the Mactan Channel to the east is Mactan Island, where Lapu-Lapu City is located. Further east across the Cebu Strait is the island of Bohol.

=== Barangays ===
Political map of Cebu City

Cebu City is politically subdivided into 80 barangays. Each barangay consists of puroks and some have sitios.

These barangays are grouped into two congressional districts, with 46 barangays in the northern district and 34 in the southern district.

As of the 2020 census, 58 barangays are classified as urban barangays where 888,481 (92.15%) of Cebu City's population lives, while the remaining 22 rural barangays are home to 75,668 residents, representing 7.85% of the total population.

The most populous barangays in the city, as of the 2020 census, are Guadalupe (70,039), Tisa (47,364), and Lahug (45,853), while Kalubihan is the least populous barangay with only 663 residents.

=== Climate ===
Cebu City has a tropical monsoon climate under the Köppen climate classification. The city has a lengthy wet season and a short dry season, with only the months of March and April falling into the latter season. Average temperatures show little variance during the year with average daily temps ranging from 27 °C (81 °F) to 29 °C (84 °F). The city on averages experiences roughly 1,700 millimeters (67 in) of precipitation annually.

Climate data for Cebu City (Mactan International Airport) 1991–2020, extremes 1972–2020
Month	Jan	Feb	Mar	Apr	May	Jun	Jul	Aug	Sep	Oct	Nov	Dec	Year
Record high °C (°F)	33.5 (92.3)	34.8 (94.6)	33.9 (93.0)	35.6 (96.1)	37.0 (98.6)	37.6 (99.7)	35.3 (95.5)	35.6 (96.1)	35.6 (96.1)	34.4 (93.9)	33.8 (92.8)	34.0 (93.2)	37.6 (99.7)
Mean daily maximum °C (°F)	29.7 (85.5)	30.0 (86.0)	31.0 (87.8)	32.2 (90.0)	32.8 (91.0)	32.2 (90.0)	31.6 (88.9)	31.9 (89.4)	31.9 (89.4)	31.4 (88.5)	31.0 (87.8)	30.3 (86.5)	31.3 (88.3)
Daily mean °C (°F)	26.8 (80.2)	27.0 (80.6)	27.8 (82.0)	28.8 (83.8)	29.4 (84.9)	28.9 (84.0)	28.3 (82.9)	28.5 (83.3)	28.4 (83.1)	28.2 (82.8)	28.0 (82.4)	27.4 (81.3)	28.1 (82.6)
Mean daily minimum °C (°F)	24.0 (75.2)	24.0 (75.2)	24.6 (76.3)	25.5 (77.9)	26.0 (78.8)	25.5 (77.9)	25.1 (77.2)	25.2 (77.4)	25.0 (77.0)	24.9 (76.8)	25.0 (77.0)	24.6 (76.3)	24.9 (76.8)
Record low °C (°F)	19.8 (67.6)	20.0 (68.0)	19.4 (66.9)	22.1 (71.8)	22.0 (71.6)	20.2 (68.4)	20.8 (69.4)	20.8 (69.4)	21.5 (70.7)	21.6 (70.9)	20.4 (68.7)	20.0 (68.0)	19.4 (66.9)
Average rainfall mm (inches)	135.1 (5.32)	88.9 (3.50)	60.9 (2.40)	55.6 (2.19)	94.4 (3.72)	180.7 (7.11)	210.6 (8.29)	157.9 (6.22)	190.4 (7.50)	207.6 (8.17)	131.0 (5.16)	171.9 (6.77)	1,685 (66.34)
Average rainy days (≥ 0.1 mm)	12	9	7	5	9	13	15	13	14	15	12	14	138
Average relative humidity (%)	84	82	80	78	79	81	83	82	82	84	83	85	82
Source: PAGASA

== Demographics ==
Language Generally Spoken at Home (2010)
Language	Inhabitants
Cebuano	913,324
English	2,298
Tagalog	1,356
Hiligaynon	724
Others	2,646

Population census of Cebu City

Year	Pop.	±% p.a.
1903	45,994	—
1918	65,502	+2.39%
1939	146,817	+3.92%
1948	167,503	+1.48%
1960	251,146	+3.43%
1970	347,116	+3.29%

Year	Pop.	±% p.a.
1975	413,025	+3.55%
1980	490,281	+3.49%
1990	610,417	+2.22%
1995	662,299	+1.54%
2000	718,821	+1.77%
2007	799,762	+1.48%

Year	Pop.	±% p.a.
2010	866,171	+2.95%
2015	922,611	+1.21%
2020	964,169	+0.93%
2024	965,332	+0.03%

Source: Philippine Statistics Authority

The city's population reached 799,762 people in 2007, and at the time of the 2010 census, the population had grown to 866,171 people, who formed at least 161,151 households.

=== Religion ===
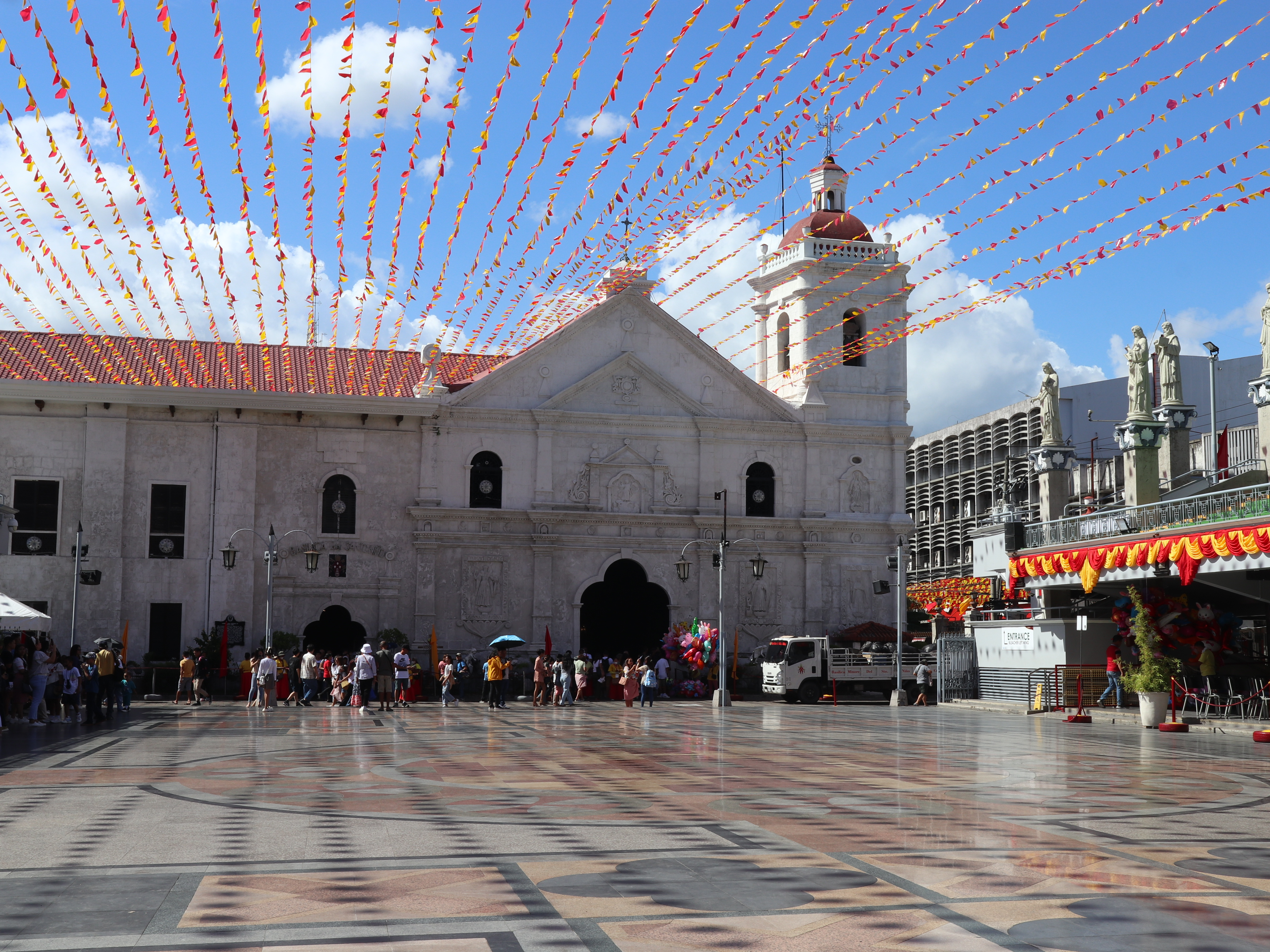
Basilica del Santo Niño, founded in 1565, was built on the spot where the image of the Santo Niño de Cebú was found during the expedition of Miguel López de Legazpi.

The city is considered the birthplace of Christianity in the Far East. The Roman Catholic Archdiocese of Cebu is currently the largest archdiocese in the Philippines and in Asia. There are plans to divide the archdiocese, which covers the entire civil Province of Cebu, into three dioceses, of which two are suffragans of the archdiocese.

Christianity in the form of Roman Catholicism is the predominant religion in Cebu for about 95% of the population, making it the 2nd most Roman Catholic affiliated city among the already majority Roman Catholic nation. The remainder of the religious population includes various Protestant faiths (Baptists, Methodists, and Presbyterians), Non-denominational groups, the Philippine Independent Church, Iglesia ni Cristo, the Church of Jesus Christ of Latter-day Saints, Jehovah's Witnesses, Seventh-day Adventist and other Christian groups. Other religions include Islam, Hinduism and Buddhism.

Sittie Maryam Mosque is one of the mosques where Muslims worship here, founded in 2013 by a Turkish community organization. Within the city is also the Cebu Taoist Temple, a Taoist temple located in the Beverly Hills Lahug subdivision.

=== Languages ===
The most recent census data on ethnicity and language (from the 2010 census) shows that the vast majority of the city's population speaks Cebuano as the primary casual vernacular language. English is also used as the primary formal medium of instruction in schools, besides Filipino class which teaches Filipino (Tagalog) across schools in Cebu and is also understood by the populace through Filipino mass media. There are also a few speakers of Hiligaynon from nearby Hiligaynon-speaking provinces in Panay and in Soccsksargen region in Mindanao and other speakers of other Visayan languages from nearby regions. Minority speakers of other Philippine languages are also residents in the city, one of them are Ilocanos, a Luzon ethnic group whose native language is the eponymous Ilocano language; Ilocanos form a minority in Cebu City, where they formed an organized association for Ilocano residents and their descendants there, including nearby cities and towns within Cebu Province. Chinese Filipinos also privately use Philippine Hokkien among fellow speakers of the language, while Mandarin (Standard Chinese) is also taught in Chinese class of Chinese Filipino schools and few other schools in Cebu.

== Economy ==
The term "Ceboom", a portmanteau of "Cebu" and "boom", has been used to refer to the rapid economic development of both Cebu City and Cebu Province from the early 1990s to the early 2000s. Cebu City is considered to be the prime trading center of the southern Philippines.

With Cebu City's proximity to many islands, beaches, hotel and resorts, diving locations, and heritage sites, high domestic and foreign tourist arrivals have fueled the city's tourism industry. Due to its geographic location in the middle of the country, accessibility by air, land and sea transportation, Cebu City has become the tourist gateway to central and southern Philippines. Its port, Port of Cebu, is the country's second largest seaport.

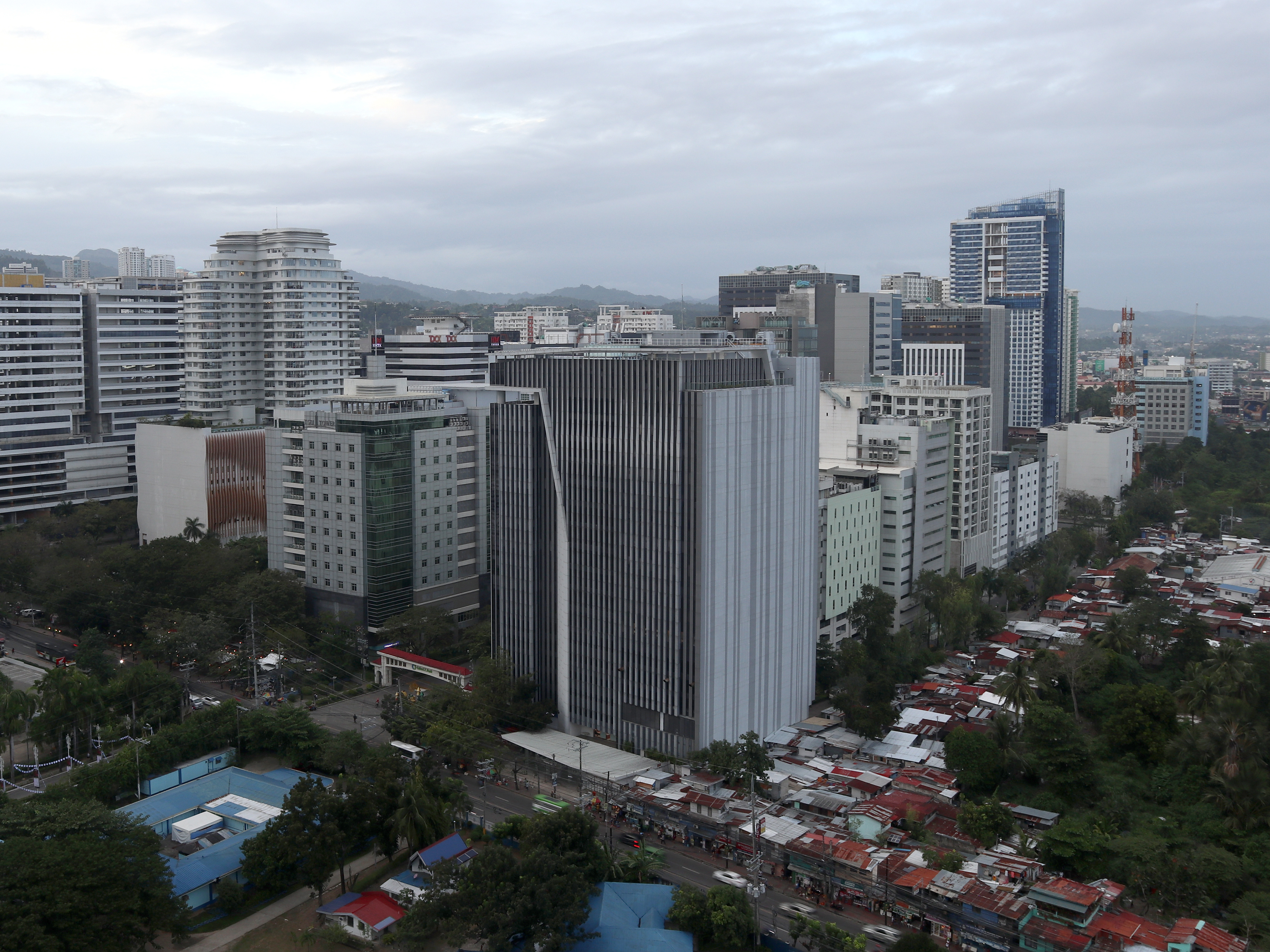
Top view of Cebu IT Park arch gate along Salinas Drive in Lahug, Cebu City.

The city is a major hub for the business process outsourcing industry of the Philippines. In 2013, Cebu ranked 8th worldwide in the "Top 100 BPO Destinations Report" by global advisory firm Tholons. In 2012, the growth in IT-BPO revenues in Cebu grew 26.9 percent at $484 million, while nationally, the industry grew 18.2 percent at $13 billion.

Aboitiz Equity Ventures, formerly known as Cebu Pan Asian Holdings, is the first holding company from Cebu City publicly listed in the Philippine Stock Exchange. Ayala Corporation, through its subsidiary Cebu Holdings, Inc. and Cebu Property, both publicly in the PSE Index, developed the Cebu Park District where the mixed-used development zones of the Cebu Business Park and Cebu IT Park are located. Both master planned areas are host to regional headquarters for various companies in the banking, finance, IT and tourism sectors among others.

Shipbuilding companies in Cebu have manufactured bulk carriers of up to 70,000 metric tons (69,000 long tons; 77,000 short tons) deadweight (DWT) and double-hulled fast craft as well. This industry made the Philippines the 4th largest shipbuilding country in the world.

With a revenue growth rate of 18.8 percent in 2012, the real estate industry is the fastest growing sector in Cebu. With the strong economic indicators and high investors' confidence level, more condominium projects and hypermarkets are being developed in the locality.

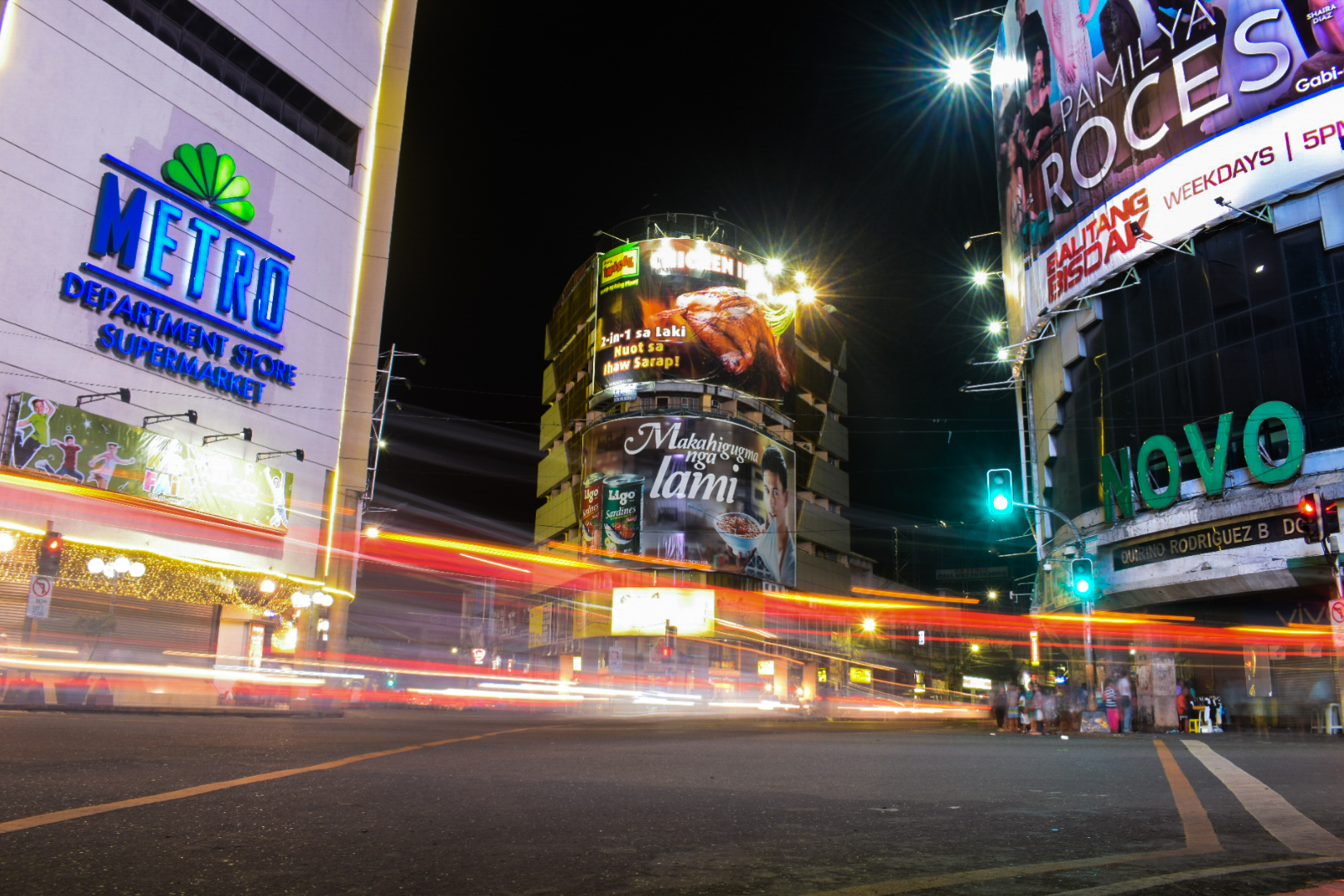
Colon Street in downtown Cebu is considered as the oldest street in the Philippines.

Colon Street, the oldest national road in the Philippines, as well as its neighboring streets and surrounding areas, collectively known as Downtown Cebu, is an important center of commerce for the city. It is home to many malls, stores, and stalls selling various goods and services. Carbon Market is the city's oldest and largest farmer's market, and is set to be redeveloped to include other lifestyle and mixed-use developments. The redevelopment is scheduled to be finished by 2025. The Pasil Fish Market, located in Barangays Pasil and Suba, is a major fish wholesale market, sourcing fresh catch from different parts of the Visayas.

The South Road Properties (SRP) is a 300-hectare (740-acre) prime property development project on a reclaimed land located a few metres off the coast of Cebu's central business district. It is a mixed-use development that will feature entertainment, leisure, residential and business-processing industries. It is registered with the Philippine Economic Zone Authority (PEZA) and is funded by the Japan Bank for International Cooperation(JBIC). Traversing the property is a 12-kilometer (7.5 mi), four-lane highway known as the Cebu Coastal Road that provides the motorists with a good view of Cebu's south coast and the nearby island of Bohol.

=== Shopping ===
SM Seaside City Cebu is the largest shopping mall in the city and 4th largest in the country.

Cebu City, and Metro Cebu as a whole, is one of the Philippines' major shopping destinations. The Gaisano family, which operates Gaisano Capital, Gaisano Grand Malls, Gaisano Malls, and the Metro Retail Stores Group, traces its roots to the city.

There are four major super-regional malls in the city. SM City Cebu, located in the North Reclamation Area, opened in 1993, and is the first SM Supermall in the Philippines located outside Metro Manila. Ayala Center Cebu, opened in 1994, is a shopping mall at the Cebu Business Park. More than 85,000 people visit the mall every day, with the figure increasing to 135,000 daily on weekends. SM Seaside, opened in November 2015, is located in the South Road Properties and is one of the largest shopping malls in the Philippines. Robinsons Galleria Cebu opened in December 2015 and is in close proximity to the Port of Cebu. Other notable retail establishments include Ayala Malls Central Bloc in Cebu IT Park, Il Corso, Gaisano Mall of Cebu, and Gaisano Country Mall, among others.

== Government ==
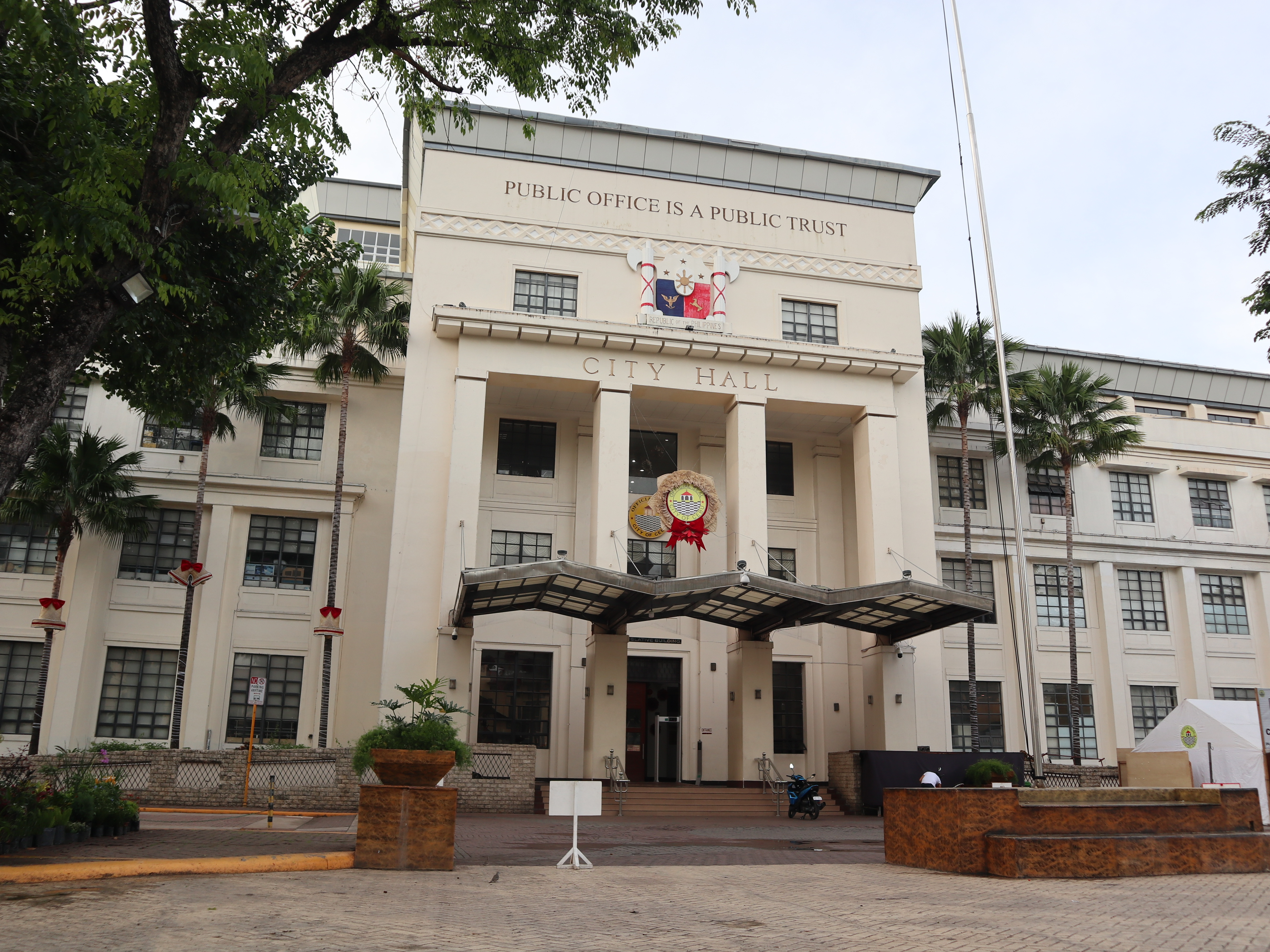
Cebu City Hall, the seat of city government

Being a highly urbanized city, Cebu City (along with neighboring Mandaue and Lapu-Lapu) is independent from Cebu province. Its electorate do not vote for provincial officials. There were proposals during the time of Governor Emilio Mario Osmeña to establish an "administrative district" that would be independent from Cebu City. This would mean carving out Cebu City's Capitol Site barangay, where the provincial capitol and other provincial offices are located. The plan, however, did not go through and was even followed by other proposals like the transfer of the capital to Balamban.

Cebu City is governed by a mayor, vice mayor and sixteen councilors (eight representing the north and eight representing the south districts). Each official is popularly elected to serve for a three-year term. The chief of the Association of Barangay Captains and the president of the Sangguniang Kabataan Federation also serve in the city council. The day-to-day administration of the city is handled by a city administrator.

Current City Officials (2025–2028)

Mayor: Nestor D. Archival Sr. (BOPK-LP)

Vice Mayor: Tomas R. Osmeña (BOPK-LP)

Representatives (20th Congress House of Representatives)

1st District (North): Rachel B. del Mar (NUP)

2nd District (South): Eduardo R. Rama Jr. (Lakas)

City Council (17th Sangguniang Panglungsod ng Cebu)

1st District (North)

• Winston Pepito (KUSUG-PFP)

• Nice Archival (BOPK-LP)

• Harold Kendrick Go (KUSUG-PFP)

• Edgardo “Jaypee” Labella II (KUSUG-PFP)

• Joel “Panday” Garganera (KUSUG-PFP)

• Pastor “Jun” Alcover Jr. (KUSUG-PFP)

• Sisinio “Bebs” Andales (BOPK-LP)

2nd District (South)

• Dave Tumulak (KUSUG-Aksyon)

• Phillip Zafra (Barug-Lakas)

• Paul Labra (BOPK-LP)

• Mikel Rama (Barug-PDP)

• Francis Esparis (Barug-Lakas)

• Michelle Abella (BOPK-LP)

• Harry Eran (Barug-Lakas)

Nonpartisan (Ex - officio members )

• Franklyn Ong (LNB)

• Rhea Mae Jakosalem (SK)

== Culture ==
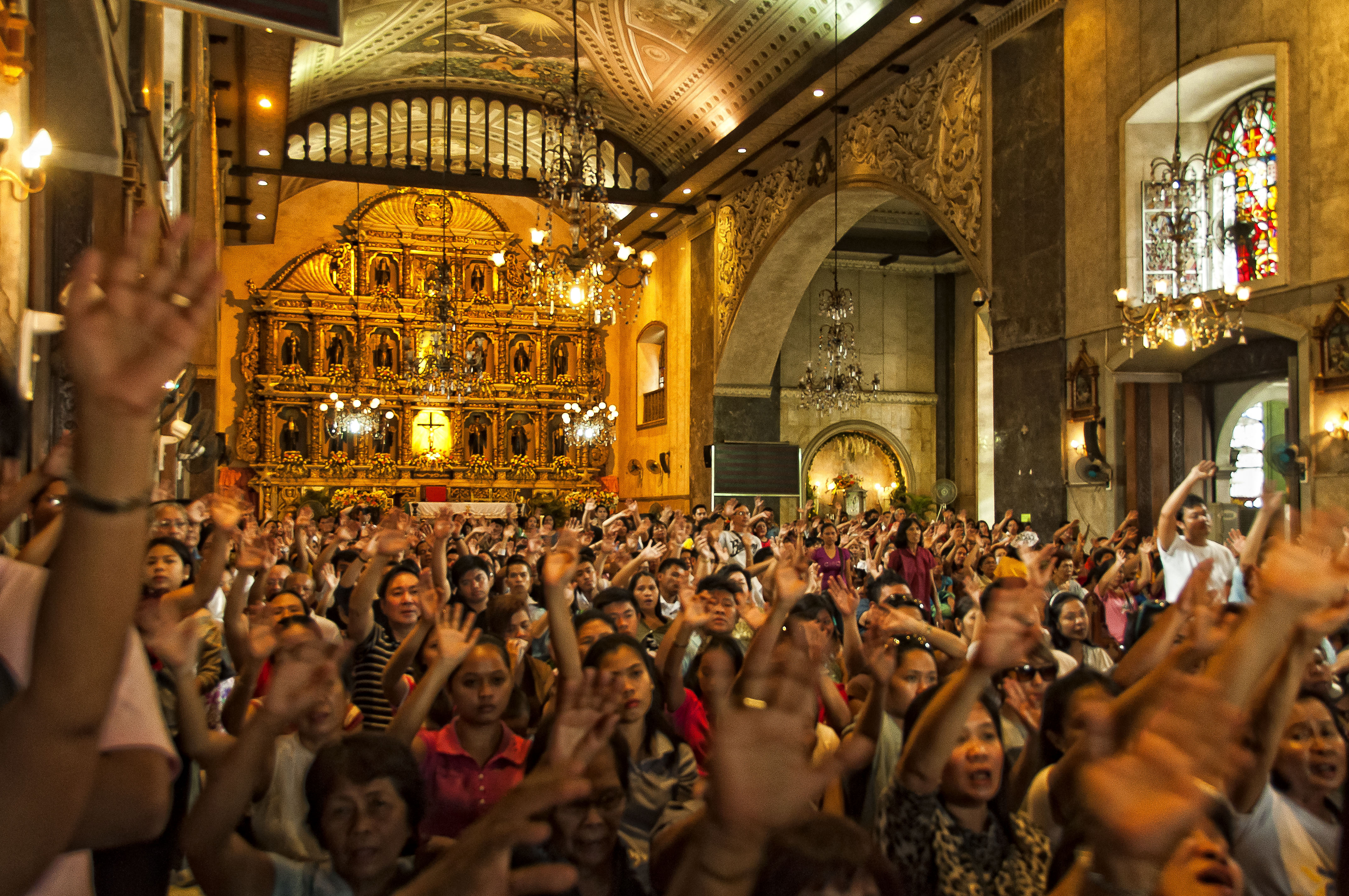
Devotees inside the Basilica del Santo Niño

Cebu City is a significant cultural center in the Philippines. The imprint of Spanish and Roman Catholic culture is evident. The city's most famous landmark is Magellan's Cross. This cross, now housed in a chapel, is reputed to have been erected by Ferdinand Magellan (Fernão Magalhães) when he arrived in the Philippines in 1521. It was encased in hollow tindalo wood in 1835 upon the order of the Augustinian Bishop Santos Gómez Marañon to prevent devotees from taking it home chip by chip. The same bishop restored the present template or kiosk, located at Magallanes Street between the City Hall and Colegio del Santo Niño. Revered by Filipinos, the Magellan's Cross is a symbol of Christianity in the Philippines.

A few steps away from Magellan's Cross is the Basilica Minore del Santo Niño (Church of the Holy Child). This is an Augustinian church elevated to the rank of basilica in 1965 during the 400th anniversary celebrations of Christianity in the Philippines, held in Cebu. The church, which was the first to be established in the islands, is built of hewn stone and features the country's oldest relic, the figure of the Santo Niño de Cebú (Holy Child of Cebu), who is Jesus Christ as a Child.

=== Festivals ===
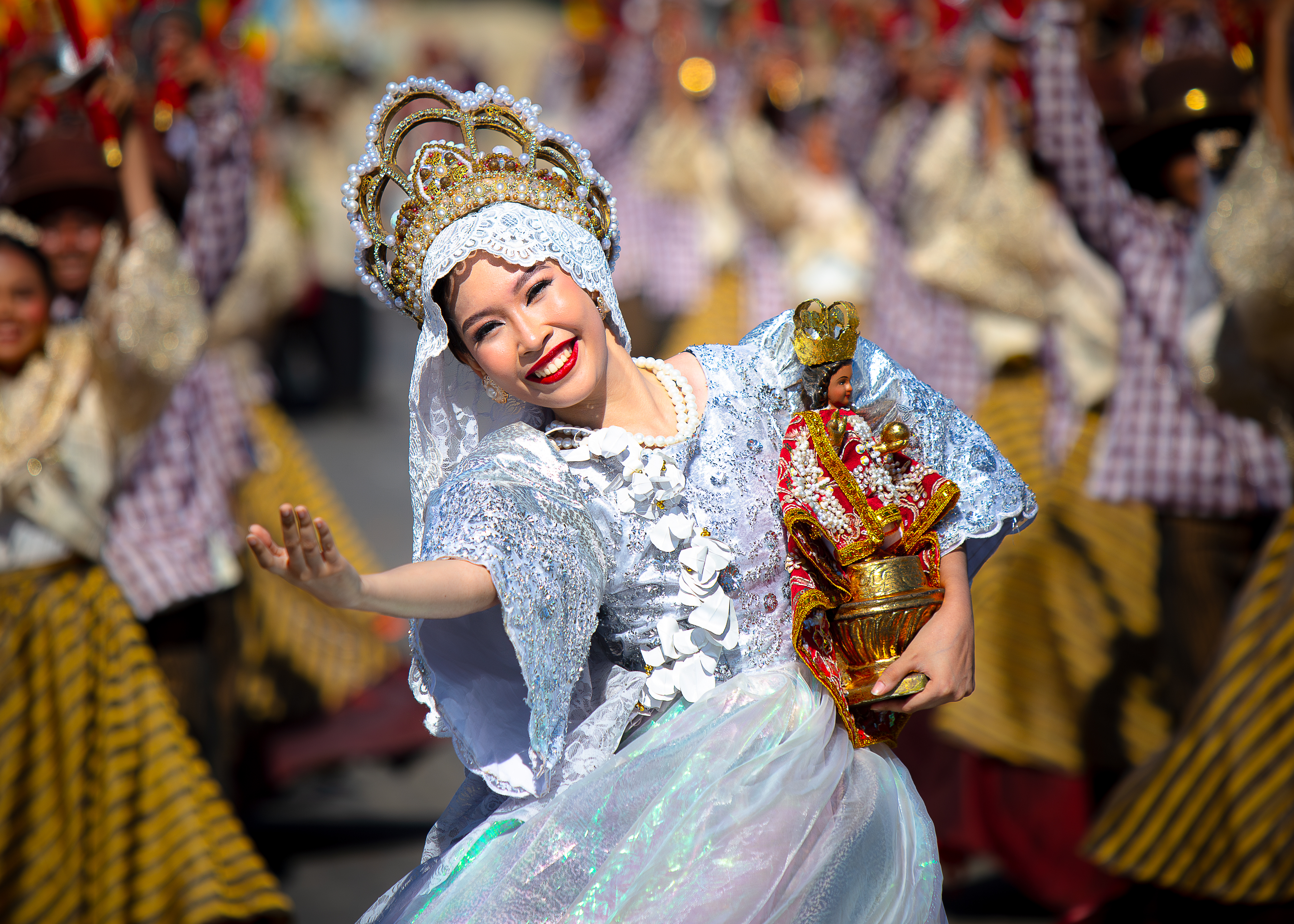
Sinulog Festival is one of the grandest festival of the Philippines in honor of Señor Santo Niño.

This religious and cultural event is celebrated during the island's cultural festivities known as the Sinulog festival. Held every third Sunday of January, it is a festival in honor of the Santo Niño, who was formerly considered to be the patron saint of Cebu. (This patronage was later changed to that of Our Lady of Guadalupe after it was realized that the Santo Niño could not be a patron saint because He is Jesus Christ who is God and not a saint.) The Sinulog is a dance prayer ritual of pre-Hispanic indigenous origin. The dancer moves two steps forward and one step backward to the rhythmic sound of drums. This movement resembles somewhat the current (sulog) of the river. Thus, the Cebuanos called it Sinulog.

When the Spaniards arrived in Cebu, the Italian chronicler Antonio Pigafetta, sailing under convoy with the Magellan expedition, offered a baptismal gift to Hara Amihan, wife of Rajah Humabon. She was later named Juana, the figure of the Santo Niño. The natives also honored the Santo Niño de Cebú in their indigenous sinulog ritual. This ritual was preserved but limited to honoring the Santo Niño. Once the Santo Niño church was built in the 16th century, the Christianized-Austronesian natives started performing the sinulog ritual in front of the church, the devotees offering candles and indigenous dancers shouting "Viva Pit Señor!"

In the 1980s and 2000s, the city authorities of Cebu added the religious feast of Santo Niño de Cebú during the Sinulog Festival to its cultural event.

The city joined UNESCO's Network of Creative Cities as a Design City on October 31, 2019, on the occasion of World Cities' Day. Cebu City was also recognized by the British Council as the Creative Capital of the Philippines. In 2019, it joined the UNESCO Creative Cities Network as a City of Design.

The Sayaw Kabataan is another Local Festival in Cebu City that is spearheaded by the Sangguniang Kabataan Federation of Cebu City that highlights Dancesport as a way to create a shared experience that fosters talents, unity, camaraderie, and sportsmanship while promoting the Barangays of the City and Youth Involvement.

The Red Lantern Festival is another festival in Cebu City which is the annual celebration of Chinese New Year for the Cebu Filipino-Chinese Community.

=== Music ===
Cebu City is regarded as the birthplace of BisRock, a term coined by Cebuano writer Januar E. Yap in 2002. Notable BisRock bands include Missing Filemon, Junior Kilat, Phylum, Rundown Genova, and Scrambled Eggs, among others. Popular Filipino bands Urbandub and Cueshé also hail from Cebu, but mostly sing their songs in English, and in the latter's case, also in Tagalog.

The Cebu Reggae Festival is a popular Filipino Reggae and Roots music festival, it now has become one of the Philippines' largest annual Reggae Festivals.

Lifedance and Sinulog Invasion are rave music festivals held in the city in the days before the Sinulog Festival. These music festivals are regarded as among the biggest music festivals in the country.

The Cebu Pop Music Festival is an annual music festival, founded in 1980, showcasing Cebuano-language pop songs. Like Lifedance and Sinulog Invasion, the music festival is also held in the days before the Sinulog Festival.

On Cebuano musical heritage, the Jose R. Gullas Halad Museum in V. Gullas St. (former Manalili) corner D. Jakosalem St. in Cebu City, holds musical memorabilia of Cebuano composers in the early 20th century, the likes of Ben Zubiri (composer of Matud Nila), Inting Rubi (Kasadya Ning Taknaa) and Minggoy Lopez (Rosas Pandan).

Since 2013, Cebu has hosted the Visayan Pop Songwriting Campaign, an annual songwriting competition that aimed to showcase songs written in the Cebuano language. Founded by multi-awarded artist Jude Gitamondoc, Ian Zafra, Cattski Espina, and Missing Filemon's front-man Lorenzo Niñal through the Artists and Musicians Marketing Cooperative (ArtistKo) with the support of the Filipino Society of Composers, Authors and Publishers. Vispop, or sometimes Visayan pop, later on evolved from being associated with the music festival to a genre of the new wave of Visayan pop songs that gained nationwide popularity, even those songs that were not exclusively produced for or presented in the contest.

=== Sports ===
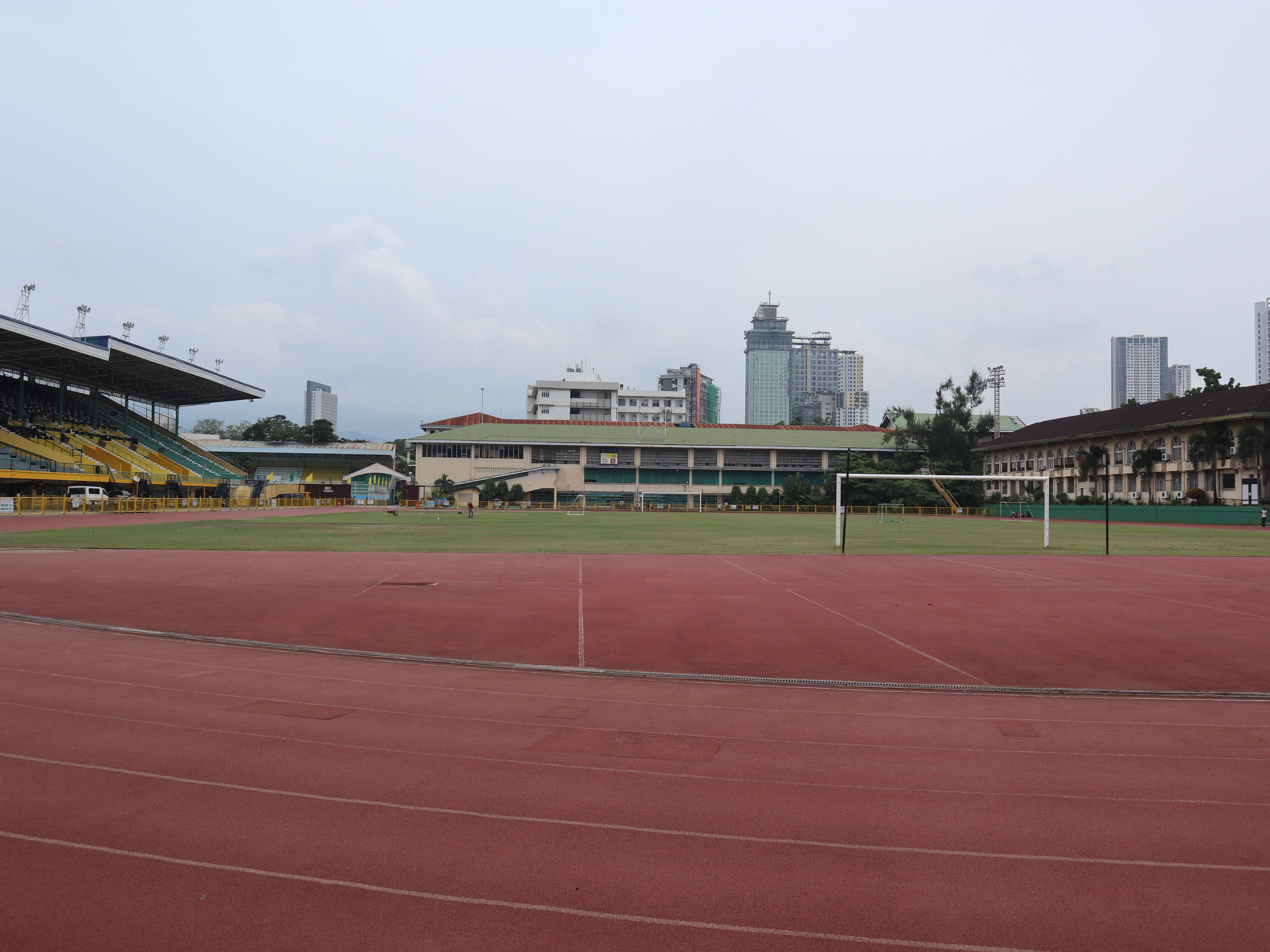
The Cebu City Sports Complex

The Cebu Schools Athletic Foundation, Inc. is based in the city. Its member schools are located within the Metro Cebu area. It is often considered one of the Philippines' strongest college sports league.

The city has an active boxing scene. ALA Gym, one of the most famous boxing gyms in the Philippines, is based in the city, at the Banilad district. In addition, ALA Gym's promotion arm, the ALA Promotions, organizes the Pinoy Pride boxing series.

The Aboitiz Football Cup is the longest-running association football competition in Cebu. The tournament is organized and supported by the Aboitiz family, one of the Philippines' richest families, and owners of one of the Philippines' largest conglomerates, the Aboitiz Equity Ventures.

The Cebu F.C. is the only professional sports club based in the city. It has played in the Philippines Football League (PFL) in 2021. The club is the second professional football club to be based in Cebu, after Global F.C., which also played in the PFL. The club plays its home games at the Dynamic Herb Sports Complex in nearby Talisay.

The city has cultivated emerging sports and flourished in which Cebu Flag Football League, or known as CFFL, is an amateur sports league for flag football. The association has partnered with Flag Football Philippines (FFP) in bringing the game of flag football in the country.

Former professional sports teams include the following:

- Global Cebu F.C., which played in the now-defunct Philippines Football League (PFL). They played their home games at the Cebu City Sports Complex. They have since moved to Makati, changing their name correspondingly into Global Makati F.C.
- Cebu City Chiefs, a rugby league team that participated in the Philippines National Rugby League
- Cebu Dragons, a rugby union team in the Philippine Rugby Football Union
- Cebu Gems, a basketball team that played in the now-defunct Metropolitan Basketball Association (MBA). The Gems played their home games at the Cebu Coliseum.
- Cebu City Sharks, a basketball team that used to play in the South Division of the Maharlika Pilipinas Basketball League (MPBL). The team has taken a leave of absence from the MPBL since 2021. The team played its home games at the Hoops Dome in nearby Lapu-Lapu City, Aznar Coliseum in Barangay Sambag I, and at the USJ-R Coliseum, located in Barangay Basak Pardo.

== Tourism ==
Cebu hosted the 1998 ASEAN Tourism Forum. The city also hosted the East Asian Tourism Forum in August 2002, in which the province of Cebu is a member and signatory. Views of Cebu City and its skyline can be seen from villages and numerous gated communities located on its mountainsides.

There is a significant number of Filipino-Spanish heritage buildings in Cebu City such as Fort San Pedro, Basilica del Santo Niño, Magellan's Cross, and the Cebu Metropolitan Cathedral. The city hosts the Museo Sugbo and Casa Gorordo Museum. The Cebu Taoist Temple is also situated within the city.

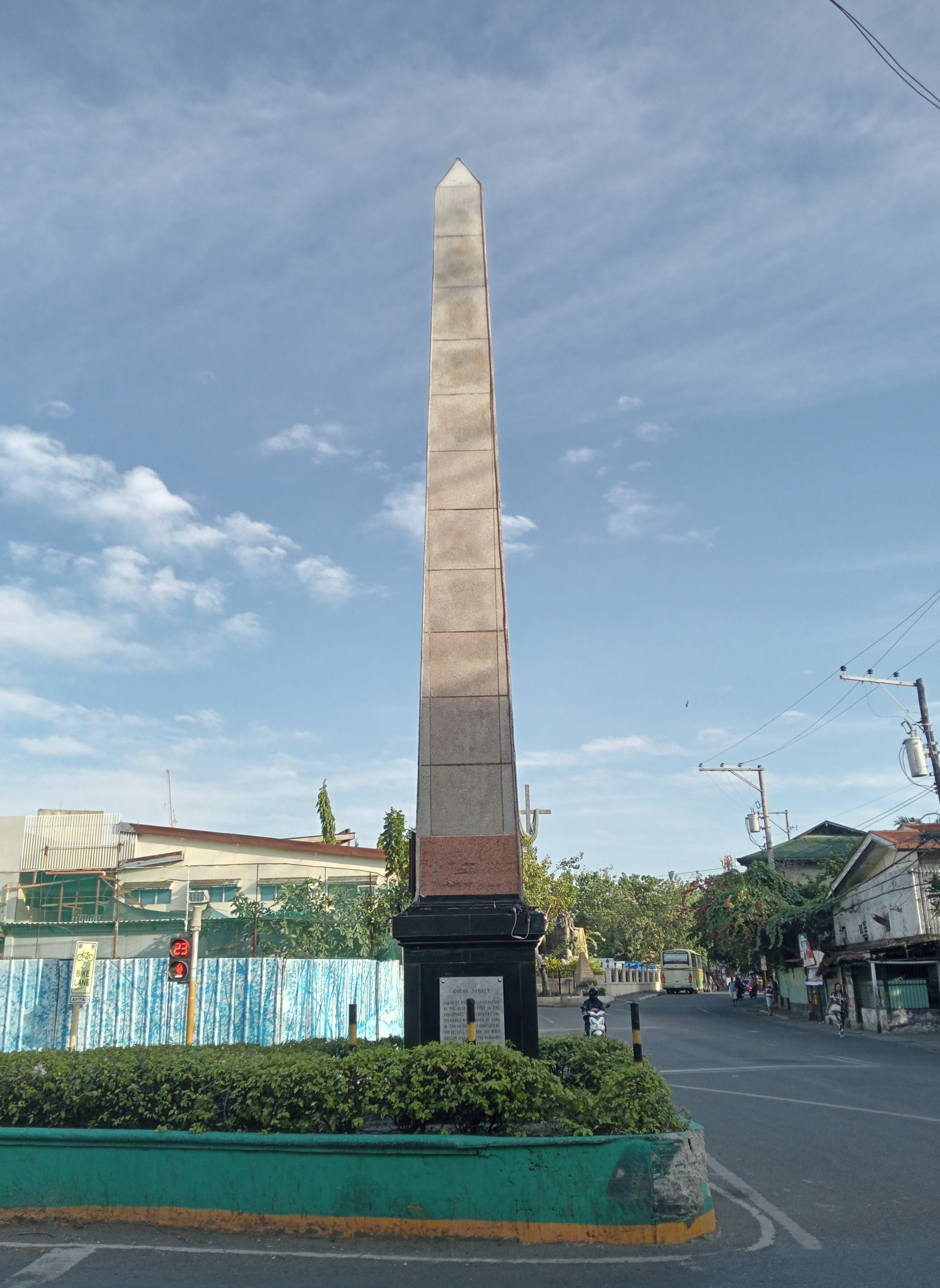
Colon Street Obelisk and Historical Marker

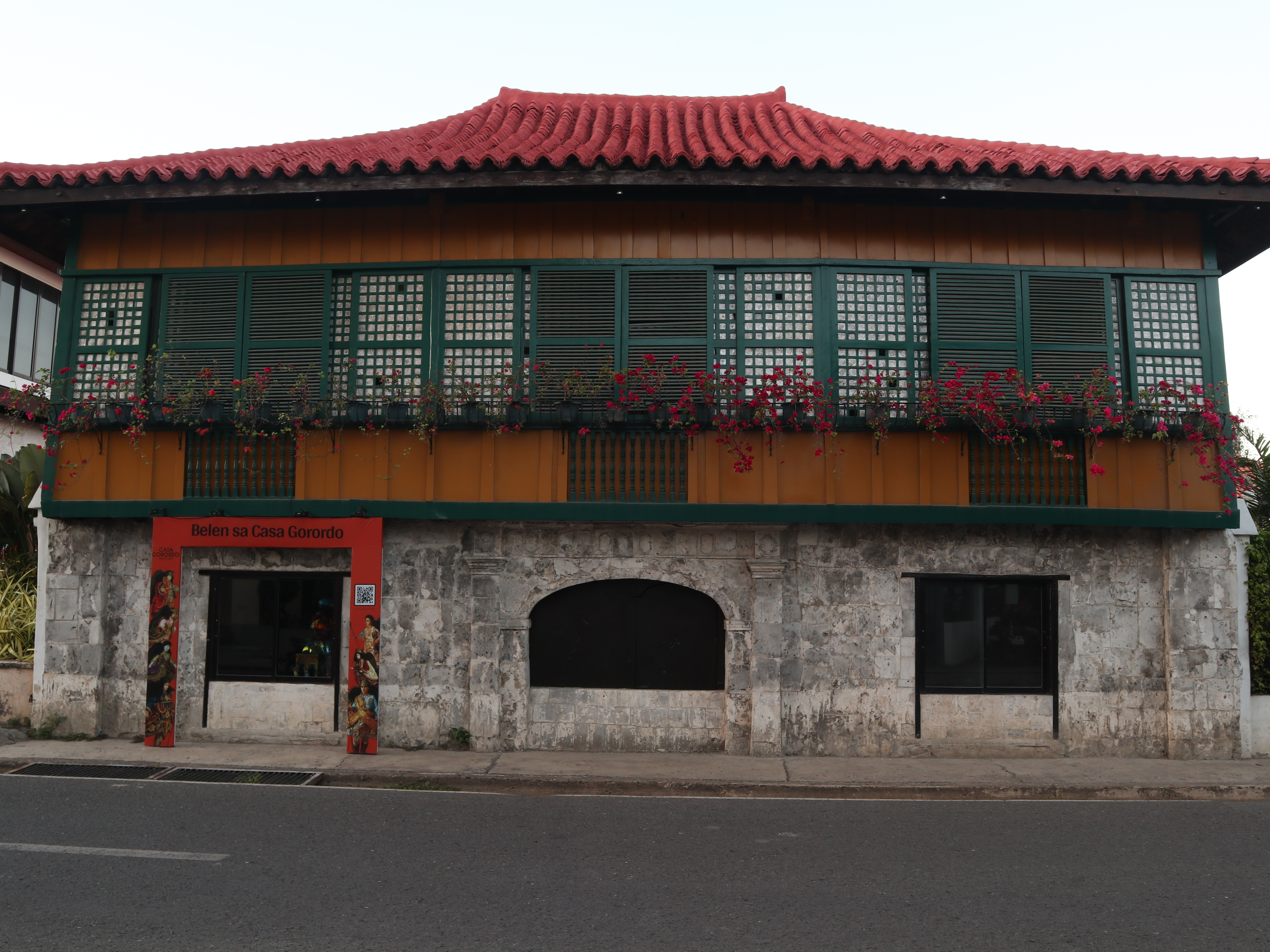
Casa Gorordo Museum

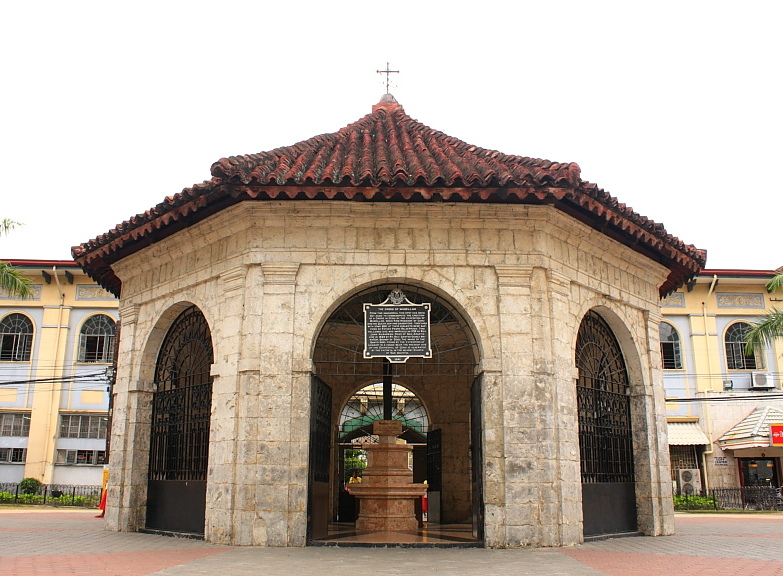
Magellan's Cross Pavilion

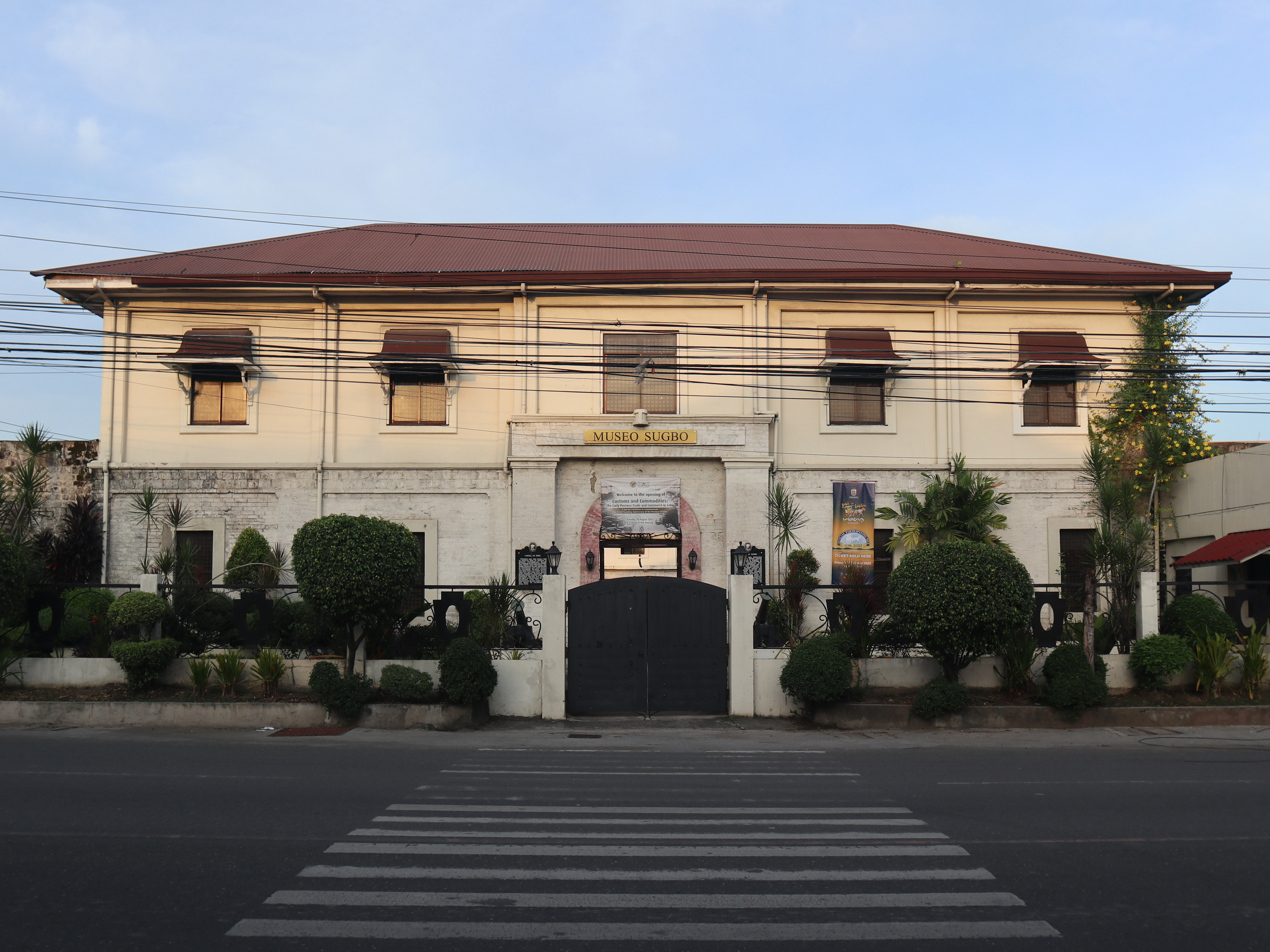
Museo Sugbo

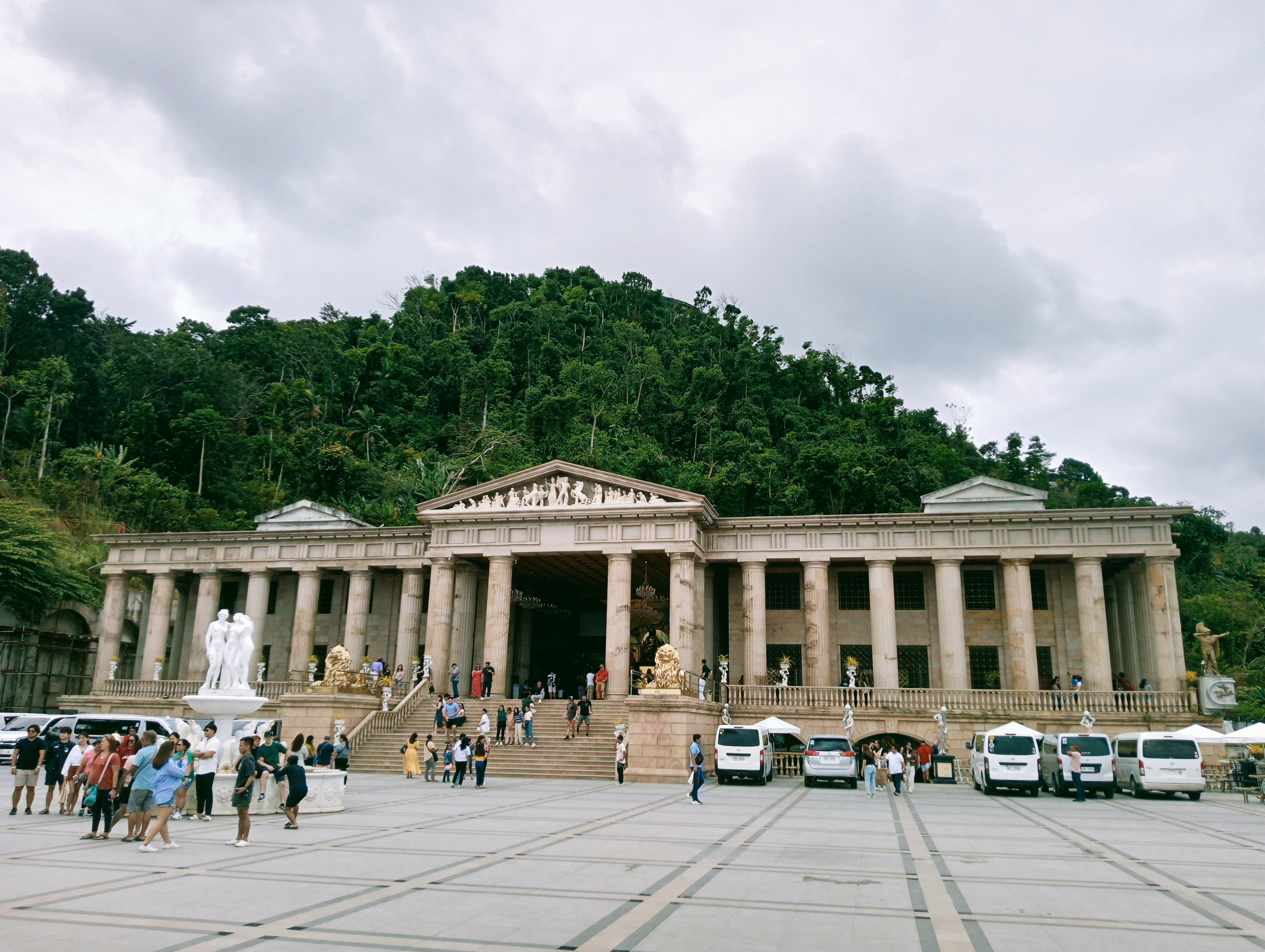
Temple of Leah

Sightseeing view at Tops

Sirao Garden

Compañía Marítima Building

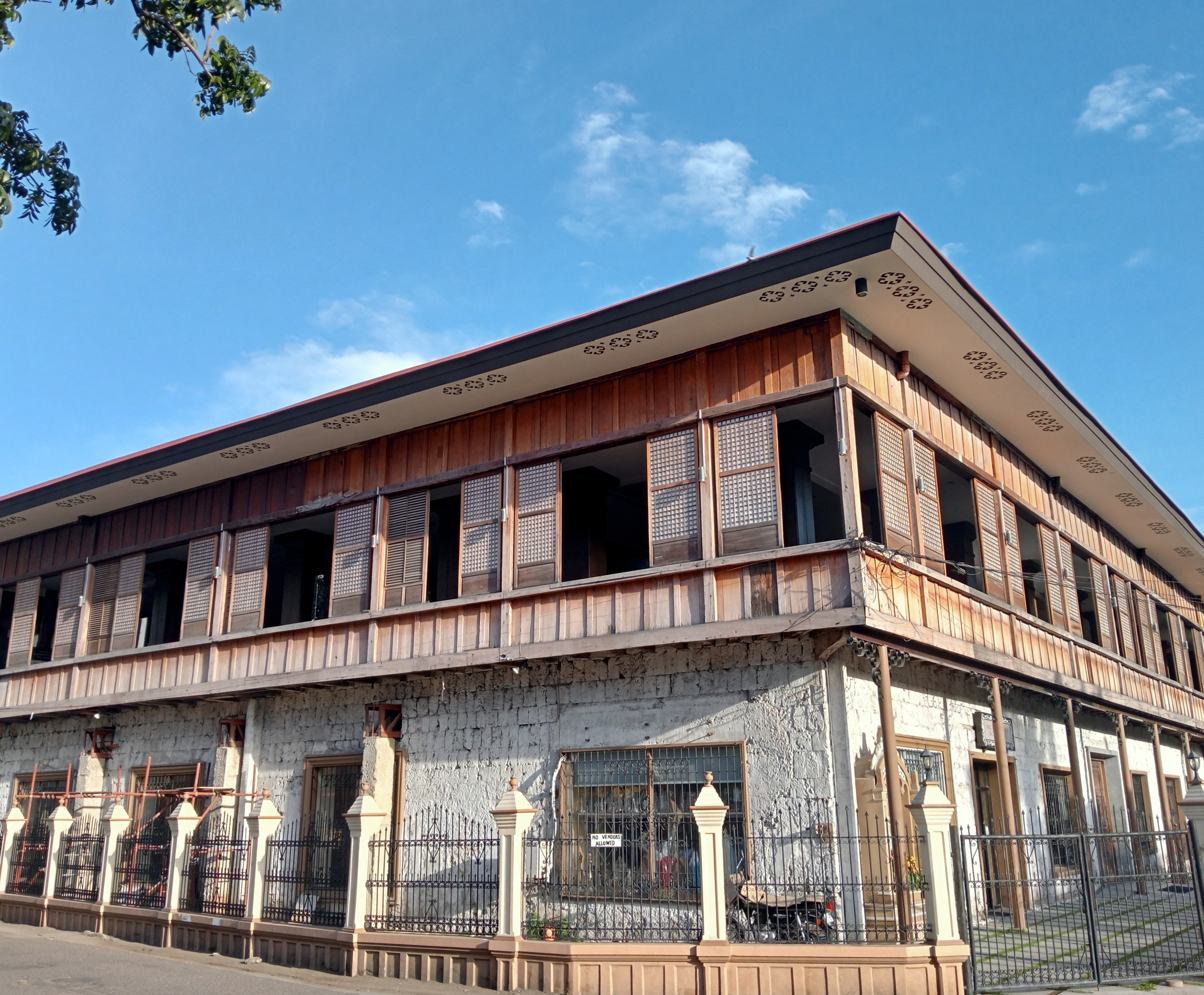
The Archdiocesan Museum of Cebu

== Transportation ==
Mactan–Cebu International Airport Terminal 2 in nearby Mactan Island

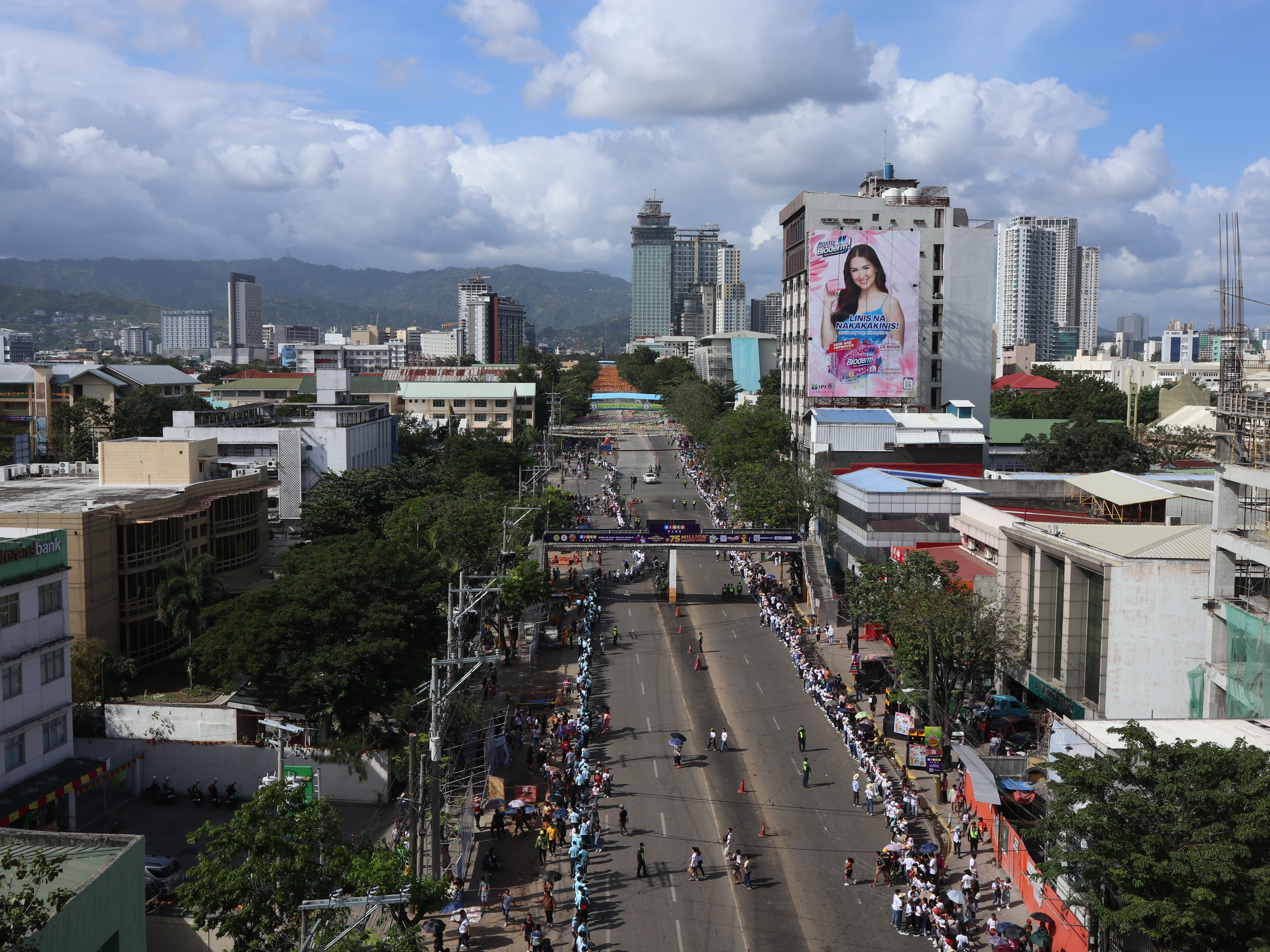
Osmeña Boulevard, a major arterial thoroughfare in Cebu City, before the Cebu BRT was constructed in its median

Mactan–Cebu International Airport, located in Lapu-Lapu, is the country's second-busiest airport and serves direct international flights and domestic destinations. Many international and cargo airlines fly to Cebu. There are also direct transfer flights via the capital's Ninoy Aquino International Airport that readily connect the city to other destinations in the world.

The city is served by a domestic and international port which are handled by the Cebu Port Authority. Much of the city's waterfront is actually occupied by the port with around 3.5 kilometers (2.2 mi) of berthing space. The city is home to more than 80% of the country's island vessels traveling on domestic routes mostly in the Visayas and Mindanao.

Transportation throughout the city and the metropolitan itself is provided by jeepneys, buses and taxis. The Cebu City Government conducted a 2012 feasibility study on implementing a bus rapid transit (BRT) system that will ease the transportation of the residents in the city and throughout the entire Metro Cebu area. Aimed to serve an estimated 330,000 passengers per day, the project would have had a capacity of 176 buses running through 33 stations along Bulacao until Talamban with a link to the South Road Properties. The project is currently branded as TransCebu and was expected to be fully operational by 2017. As of March 2017 it was two years late, and the price had increased to ₱9.04B (US$180M). Groundbreaking for the BRT was held in 2023, five years after operations were supposed to begin. After further delays due to external circumstances, partial operations for the BRT finally began on March 13, 2026.

Cebu UMRT, a mass transit system that uses rail lines, has been proposed in the JICA Study for both 2015 and 2019. The lines were included in the masterplan: a 67.5-kilometer Central Line as the first phase of the project is an underground railway that runs between Carcar City and Danao City, while the line will also traverse the areas of Cebu City; and a 25-kilometer Coastal Line from Talisay to Lapu-Lapu City, which will also traverse in the city.

In March 2019, the Land Transportation Franchising and Regulatory Board announced the opening of a new Premium Point-to-Point Bus Service in Cebu City with three express bus routes to Lapu-Lapu, Danao and Sibonga.

In May 2025, President Bongbong Marcos reaffirmed his support for major infrastructure projects intended to position Cebu as a national logistics hub. Key among these are the proposed Fourth Mactan-Cebu Bridge and the Mandaue City Coastal Road, both expected to ease traffic and reduce travel time between Mactan-Cebu International Airport in Lapu-Lapu City and the Cebu Port area from approximately 45 minutes to around 20 minutes. The New Cebu International Container Port (NCICP) in Consolacion, a ₱16-billion, 25-hectare facility, also broke ground in February 2025 and is designed to streamline logistics operations in Central Visayas.

== Infrastructure ==
=== Utilities ===
The city mostly gets its power from an interconnection grid with the Leyte Geothermal Power Plant, which also powers the majority of the Visayas. Cebu is also powered by a coal-fired thermal plant with two units each generating 52.5-MW and 56.8-MW, a 43.8-MW diesel power plant and 55-MW land-based gas turbine plants located at the Naga power complex which is planned to be rehabilitated and replaced with 150-MW coal units by 2016 and to be completed by 2019.

Telecommunication facilities, broadband and wireless internet connections are available and are provided by some of the country's largest telecommunication companies.

In 1998, the 15-hectare (37-acre) Inayawan Sanitary Landfill was constructed to ease garbage disposal within the city. After 15 years, the landfill reached its lifespan and the Talisay city government recently allowed Cebu to temporarily dump its garbage in its own 2-hectare (4.9-acre) landfill. In 2015, Cebu appropriated a total of ₱2.5M to close and rehabilitate the landfill at Inayawan.

== Education ==
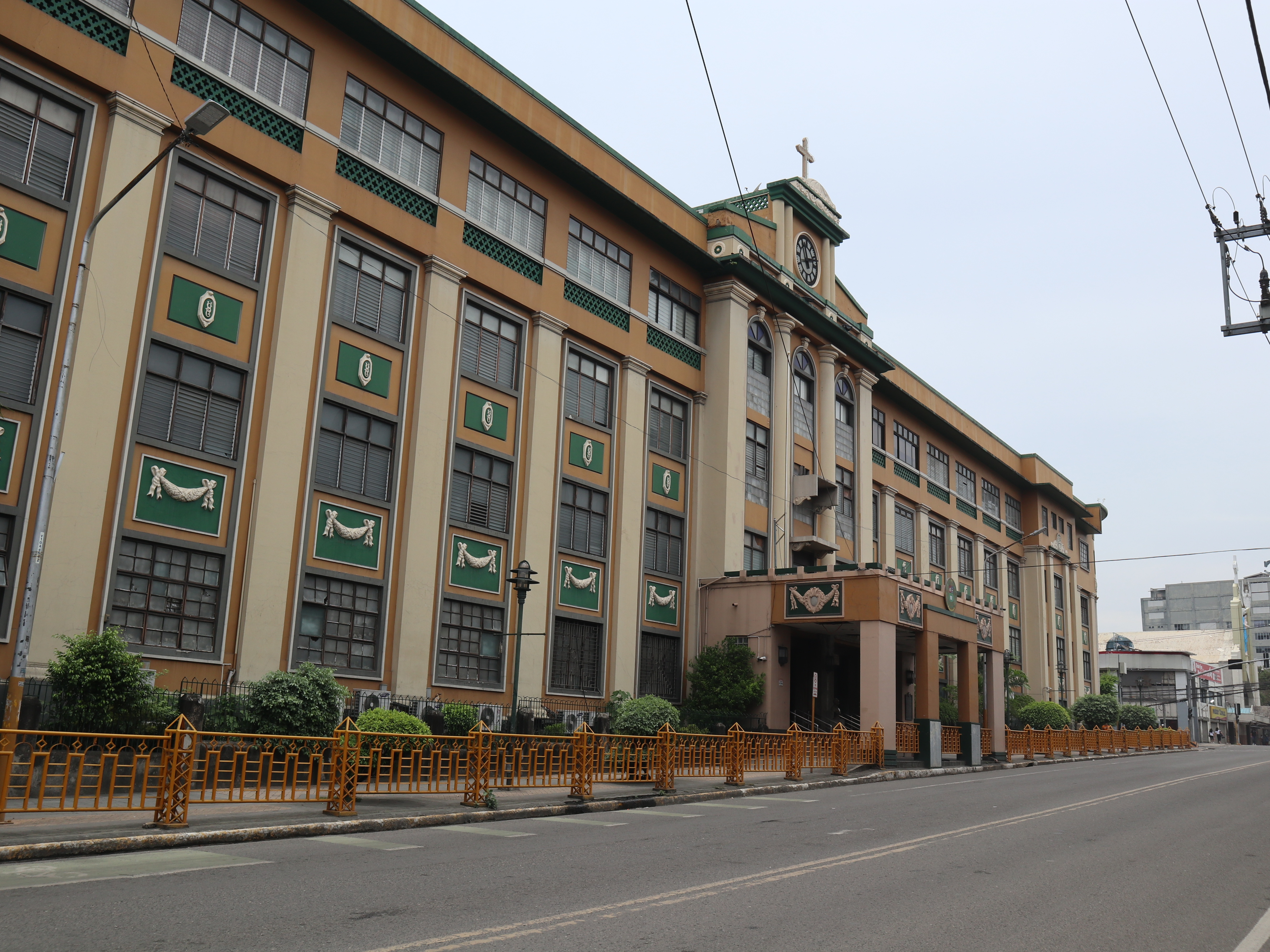
University of San Carlos

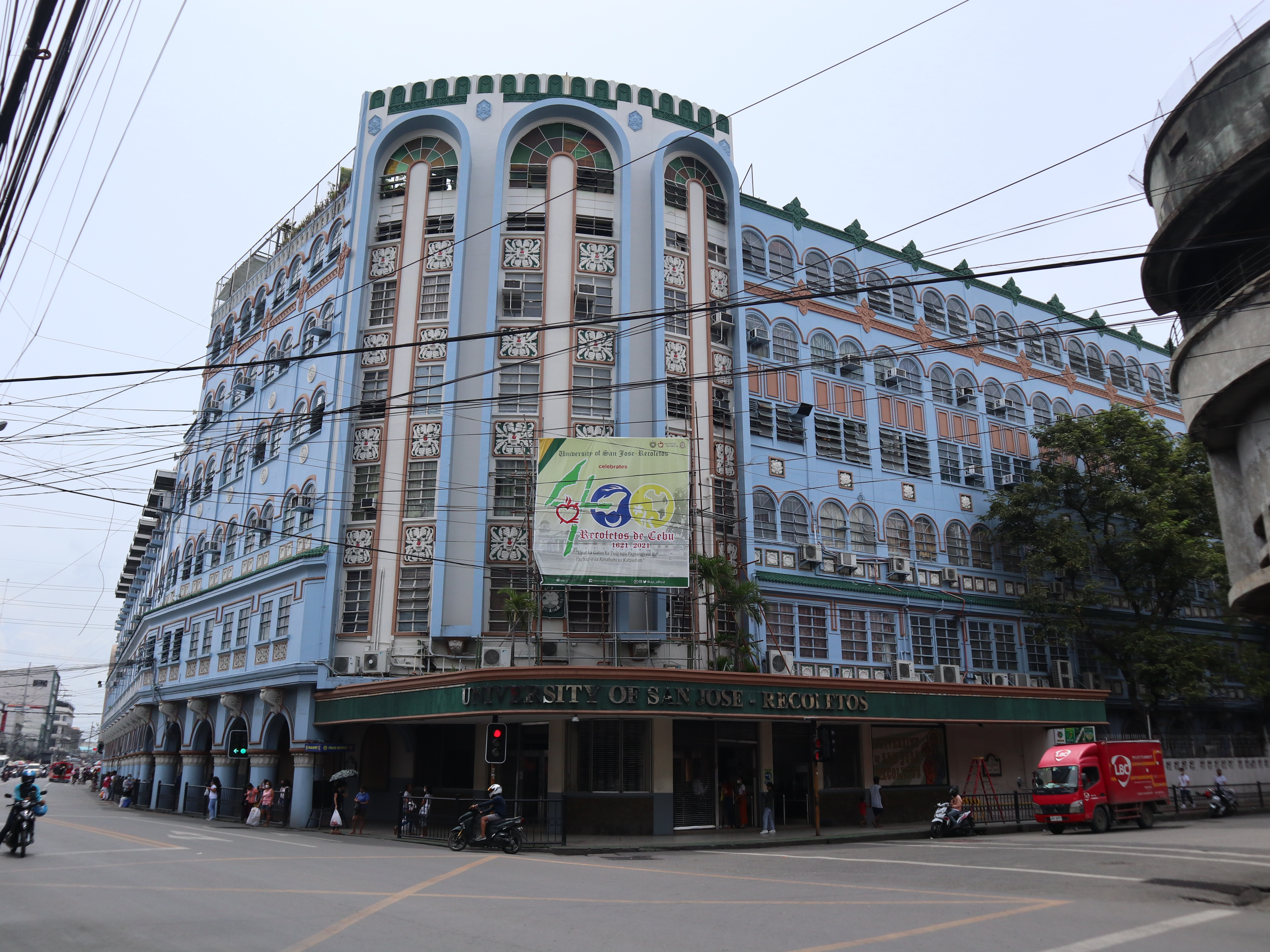
University of San Jose – Recoletos

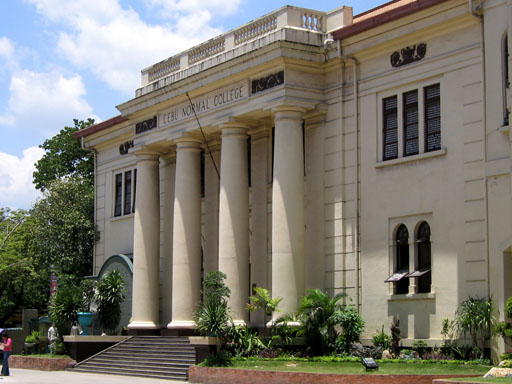
Cebu Normal University

Cebu City, and Metro Cebu as a whole, is an important educational hub in Southern Philippines. Cebu City itself is currently home to ten large universities each with a number of campuses throughout Cebu province and more than a dozen other schools specializing in various courses.

Among these schools is the University of San Carlos, one of the most highly regarded educational institutions in the Philippines. It claims to trace its roots to Colegio de San Ildefonso, which was founded in 1595. It has five campuses around Cebu City, including the Downtown Campus (formerly Main Campus) and the Talamban Campus (TC), both of which are home to the school's college programs. It is currently headed by the Society of the Divine Word.

The University of the Philippines Cebu, located at Barangay Camputhaw in the district near Lahug currently has eight courses and has plans of expansion and development. The U.P. Board of Regents elevated the status of U.P. Cebu as a constituent university of the University of the Philippines System on October 27, 2016.

Another Catholic university in Cebu City is the University of San Jose–Recoletos which was established in 1947. It is currently headed by the Augustinian Recollects and has two different campuses within the city, excluding a new campus outside the city located in the municipality of Balamban.

Cebu Normal University (CNU) was established in 1902 as a provincial normal school, a branch of the Philippine Normal School. It became an independent institution in 1924, a chartered college in 1976, and a university in 1998. CNU offers academic programs at the nursery, kindergarten, elementary, junior high, undergraduate, and graduate levels. CNU is designated by the Commission on Higher Education (CHED) as Center of Excellence (COE) in both Nursing Education and Teacher Education.

The Cebu Doctors' University (formerly Cebu Doctors' College) was granted university status in November 2004. It is the only private school in the Philippines to achieve university status without a designated basic education (pre-school – high school) curriculum; it caters mainly to courses related to the health services field. It was relocated to a nine-story building in 2007 at the Cebu Boardwalk (now Dr. P.V. Larrazabal Jr. Avenue) in neighboring city of Mandaue, thus closing its old campus near the then Cebu Doctors' Hospital (now Cebu Doctors' University Hospital). As of 2016, the university now offers senior high school (grades 11 and 12)

The University of Cebu (UC) has four campuses located within the city: Its main campus, located in Sanciangko Street, offers degree programs such as a Bachelor of Science in Information Technology (BSIT), HRM, Computer Engineering, BSED and others. The Maritime Education & Training Center (METC), located in Barangay Mambaling, which hosts the university's maritime programs, was opened in 1991. Its third campus, in Barangay Banilad, was opened in June 2002. A fourth campus, the Pardo–Talisay campus, located in Barangay Bulacao Pardo, near the boundary between Cebu City and Talisay, was added to the UC network in 2021 after the university's acquisition of St. Paul College Foundation, Inc.

Also located in the city is the University of the Visayas, established in 1919, and is considered to be the first educational institution in Cebu which was granted with a university status. It was granted an autonomous status by the Commission on Higher Education (CHED) in 2010 and currently offers basic education and a number of courses in the tertiary level including medical courses (Medicine, Nursing, Dentistry, Pharmacy, Midwifery, and Health Care Services) which are housed in its campus in Banilad area. Aside from its campuses within Cebu City, it also has numerous campuses located around the province of Cebu.

Other noteworthy institutions in the city include the Cebu Institute of Technology – University (formerly Cebu Institute of Technology), the main campus of Cebu Technological University (formerly the Cebu State College of Science and Technology), Southwestern University, University of Southern Philippines Foundation in Lahug and Mabini, Asian College of Technology (formerly Asian Computer Institute), Benedicto College, Cebu Eastern College, Cebu International School, Colegio de la Inmaculada Concepcion, College of Technological Sciences - Cebu, Don Bosco Technical College–Cebu (DBTC), Saint Theresa's College of Cebu, Sacred Heart School - Ateneo de Cebu, Salazar Colleges of Science and Institute of Technology, and Velez College (together with its independently administered medical school arm Cebu Institute of Medicine), among others.

Cebu City has 68 public elementary schools, 23 national high schools and 28 night high schools. These night high schools are operated by the city government.

The Cebu City Public Library and Information Center is the only public library in Cebu.

== Sister cities ==
=== International ===
- Barcelona, Spain
- Chengdu, China
- Chula Vista, United States
- Guadalajara, Mexico
- Honolulu, United States
- Kaohsiung, Taiwan
- Kortrijk, Belgium
- Parramatta City, Australia
- Rio de Janeiro, Brazil
- Sabrosa, Portugal
- Salinas, United States
- Seattle, United States
- Saint Petersburg, Russia
- Vladimir, Russia
- Vladivostok, Russia
- Xiamen, China
- Yokohama, Japan
- Yeosu, South Korea

=== Local ===
- Butuan City
- Davao City
- Bacolod City
- Koronadal City
- General Santos City
- Himamaylan City
- Manila
- San Juan City
- Parañaque City
- Ozamiz City
- Cabanatuan City

== See also ==
- Economy of Cebu
- List of parishes in Cebu
- List of people from Cebu
- Roman Catholic Archdiocese of Cebu
- Metro Cebu

== Sources ==
- Cebu Daily News, Doris C. Bongcac & Tweeny M. Malinao (June 22, 2012). "Guadalupe plebiscite scheduled on July 28". Archived from the original on February 21, 2021.
- Bunachita, Jose Santino S. (January 3, 2017). "Road right-of-way costs up for BRT". Cebu Daily News. Archived from the original on February 27, 2017.
- Foreman, John (1906). The Philippine Islands. A political, geographical, ethnographical, social and commercial history of the Philippine Archipelago and its political dependencies, embracing the whole period of Spanish rule (3rd ed.). New York: Charles Scribner's Sons. Archived from the original on May 4, 2018.
- Gonzales, Glenda R. (December 2004). "Metro Cebu: A Metropolitan Area in Need of Coordinative Body" (PDF). Discussion Paper. 2004–49. PIDS. Archived (PDF) from the original on March 10, 2016.
- "A 'megadome' for Cebu City: Councilor Jack". SunStar. May 16, 2007. Archived from the original on January 16, 2010.
- "Wenceslao: Banawa-Englis dream shot down". SunStar. August 1, 2012. Archived from the original on August 1, 2012.

First	Capital of the Spanish East Indies; 1565–1569	Succeeded by Iloilo City
