= Missing Filemon =

Cebuano rock band

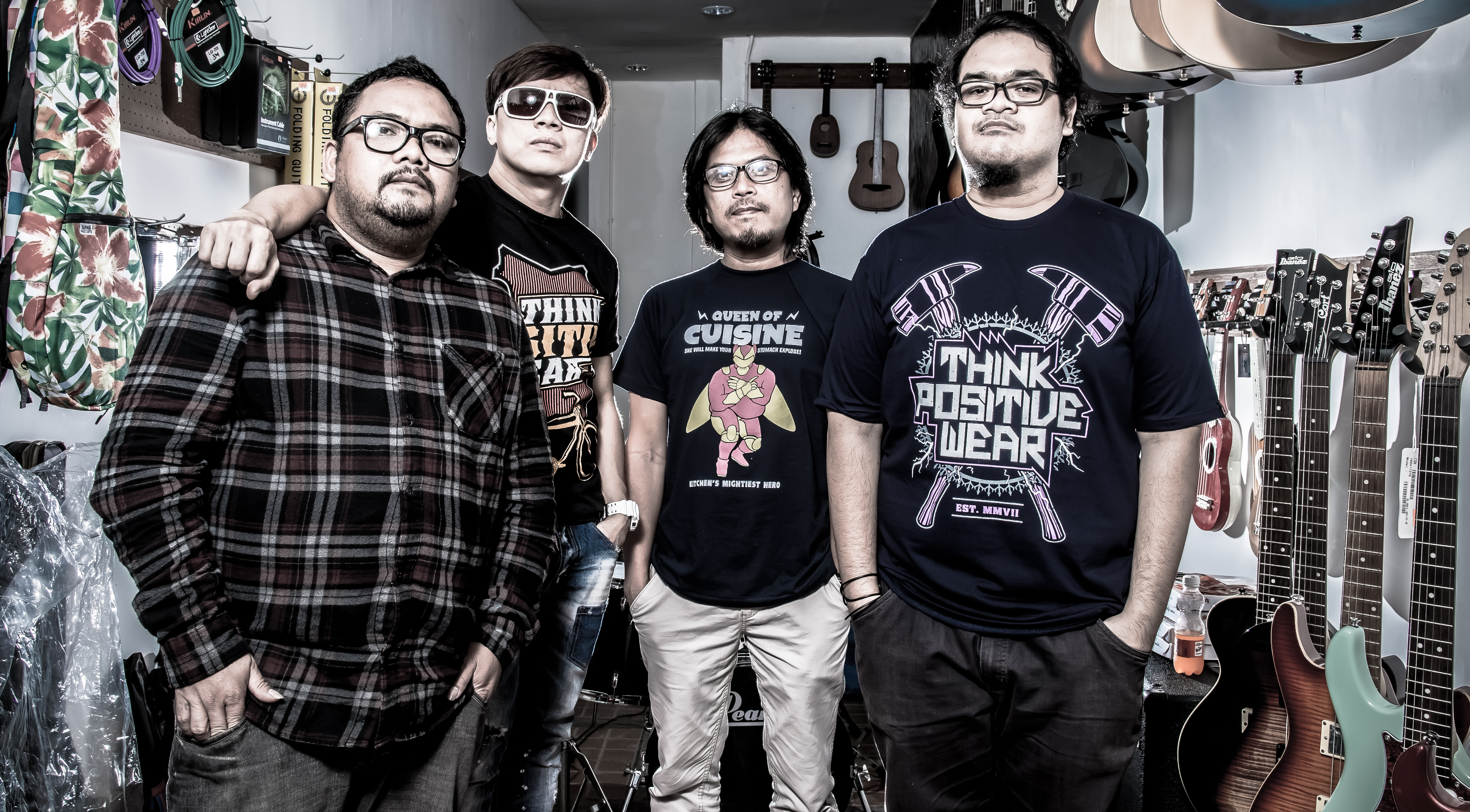
- L-R: Gumer Entero, Eimer Tabasa and Insoy Niñal

Background information
- Origin: Cebu City, Philippines
- Genres: BisRock
- Years active: 2024
- Members: Lorenzo "Insoy" Niñal; Gumer "Remugs" Entero; Eimer "BOYmerong" Tabasa
- Past members: Cocoy Hermoso; Arni Aclao; Archie Uy; Clarence Mongado; Ronald Capio
- Website: Facebook page

Missing Filemon is a Filipino rock band from Cebu. The band was founded in 2002. They won a FAMAS Award for Best Theme Song for the 2007 film Confessional.

== Discography ==
=== Albums ===
- Missing Filemon (2003)
- Sine Sine (2005)
- Kawanangan (2012)
- Dekada (2014)
- We Love our Titser Max Surban (2015)

== Awards and nominations ==
Year	Nominee / work	Award	Result
2008	"Sine-Sine"	FAMAS Awards - Best Theme Song (for the movie Confessional)	Won
2016	"Missing Filemon"	Awit Awards - Best New Artist (Group)	Nominated
2020	"Missing Filemon"	83rd Cebu City Charter Day - Most Outstanding Institution (Group)	Won
