= Bisrock =

Music genre

- Stylistic origins: Pinoy rock, Visayan music
- Cultural origins: 1980s, Cebu, Philippines
- Typical instruments: Vocals, acoustic guitar, electric guitar, bass guitar, drums

Bisrock is a subgenre of Pinoy rock, propagated by the Cebu rock music industry in the Philippines. The term, which is in the blended form, comes from the Cebuano words Bisaya, referring the Visayan languages, and "rock", for rock music. The term was coined by Cebuano writer Januar E. Yap in 2002 and was first applied to Missing Filemon's first album. Earning wide reception among the young in the Visayas and Mindanao, Bisrock is a fairly recent cultural phenomenon. The style started around the 1980s, when Cebu's rock scene was beginning to be labeled as "Bisrock". During this time, a group of musicians from the University of San Carlos coined the local music scene as Bisrock in support of patriotism for the Cebuano music scene. However, this genre is debatable as Bisrock seems to be popular only in Cebu. As it is, the movement died down around 2009, as even Missing Filemon themselves distanced itself from the term "Bisrock".

== List of Bisrock bands ==
Cebuano rock bands popularizing songs written in the Cebuano language include:

- 1017
- Gedz Band
- Abscond
- The Abyss
- Agipo
- Assembly Language
- Aggressive Audio
- BTU (Beyond the Unknown)
- Cordless
- Enchi
- Emping
- Fervent
- Indephums
- Junior Kilat
- Kabobo
- Kanteen
- Kazoku
- Makadawa
- Mantequilla
- Missing Filemon
- Pavel Camoro
- Phylum
- Scrambled Eggs
- Smooth Friction
- The Ambassadors
- The Agadiers
- TimeSlot
- WetSlipperz
- Zero Info

== See also ==
- Yoyoy Villame
- Max Surban
