= Cebu–Mactan Bridge =

Cebu–Mactan Bridge may refer to any of the three bridges that connect Cebu and Mactan islands, both located in Visayas, Philippines:

- Sergio Osmeña Bridge, officially known as Serging Veloso Osmeña Jr. Bridge, opened in 1972
- Marcelo Fernan Bridge, opened in 1999
- Cebu–Cordova Link Expressway, opened in 2022
