= Muelle Osmeña Lighthouse =

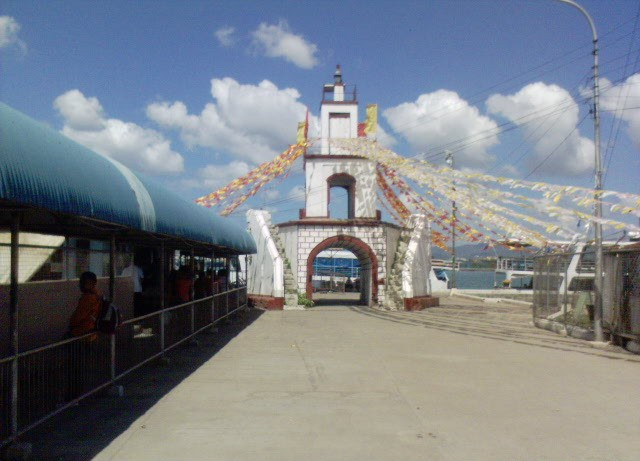
- Muelle Osmeña in 2010
- Location: Mactan, Lapu-Lapu City, Cebu, Philippines
- Coordinates: 10°18′49″N 123°56′53″E

Tower
- Constructed: 1910
- Construction: coral rag
- Markings: blue, white

Light
- Focal height: 10 m (33 ft)
- Range: 6 nmi (11 km; 6.9 mi)
- Characteristic: Fl R 5s

The Muelle Osmeña is a historic wharf in Lapu-Lapu, Philippines. It host a lighthouse which stands along the Mactan Channel. The structure was built in 1910 which is made out of coral stones. It is named after Philippine President Sergio Osmeña, who was also a native of Cebu.

In December 2020, the lighthouse structure had a blue and white facade with some presence of cracks. It was repurposed as a storage area and sleeping quarters of the homeless which prompted the Lapu-Lapu city government to launch a restoration program for the Muelle Osmeña.
