= Ceboom =

Ceboom (sometimes spelled in all caps) is a portmanteau of "Cebu" and "boom", and has been used to refer to the rapid economic development of Cebu from the late 1980s to the early 1990s.

== Economic growth ==
After Emilio Mario Osmeña won the Cebu provincial elections in 1988, he increased the provincial budget to 1 billion pesos per annum. Together with his first cousin Mayor Tomas "Tommy" Osmeña of Cebu City, made a coalition along with other key political figures and business allies. Both of them served as brokers for the business community, with Manila-based Ayala Corporation and the Sy-led SM Prime Holdings developing major new shopping malls and business districts.

This made possible the construction of several new infrastructure for the province and Cebu City itself (flyovers, causeways, roads, bridges, highways, a water distribution program, a provincial telephone system, the modernization of the Cebu City's international airport including the initiation of direct international flights to and from the airport, and the improving of electricity access for rural areas that had lacked access to such an essential need). Because of these infrastructure projects, the province and Cebu City experienced an economic miracle under his watch until Typhoon Ruping (international name: Mike) struck both the city and the province.

== Role of Typhoon Ruping ==
Super Typhoon Mike (PAGASA name: Ruping) crossed Cebu on November 13, 1990, destroying many houses in Cordova, sinking ships in the harbor of Cebu City, and leaving the metropolitan Cebu area without electricity and potable water. It took about a month to restore electricity.

== Resumption of the economic miracle ==
After the typhoon, Cebu's infrastructure was updated, and two major mall chains in the country, SM and Ayala, opened shopping malls in the city. Road widenings and construction projects mushroomed, and the old Mactan-Mandaue Bridge (itself an engineering feat at that time) began to experience traffic bottlenecks. A second bridge called the Marcelo Fernan Bridge was later constructed to solve the bottlenecks.

== After effects ==
CEBOOM was instrumental in Emilio Mario Osmeña's confidence in bidding for the 1992 and 1998 presidential elections. It also strengthened the concept of a Federal State of Cebu.

== See also ==
- Cebu City
- Economy of Cebu
