= Sergio Osmeña (disambiguation) =

Sergio Osmeña (1878−1961), also known as Sergio Osmeña Sr., was a Filipino politician who served as the 4th President of the Philippines from 1944 to 1946.

Sergio Osmeña may also refer to:

== People ==
- Sergio Osmeña Jr. (1916−1984), also known as Sergio "Serging" Veloso Osmeña Jr., Filipino politician, senator and the 13th Mayor of Cebu City
- Serge Osmeña (born 1943), also known as Sergio "Serge" de la Rama Osmeña III, Filipino politician and senator

== Places ==
- Sergio Osmeña Jr. Bridge, popularly known as the Mactan–Mandaue Bridge, a bridge in Cebu, Philippines
- Sergio Osmeña, Zamboanga del Norte, a municipality in Zamboanga del Norte, Philippines
