= Economy of Cebu =

Economy of the Province of Cebu
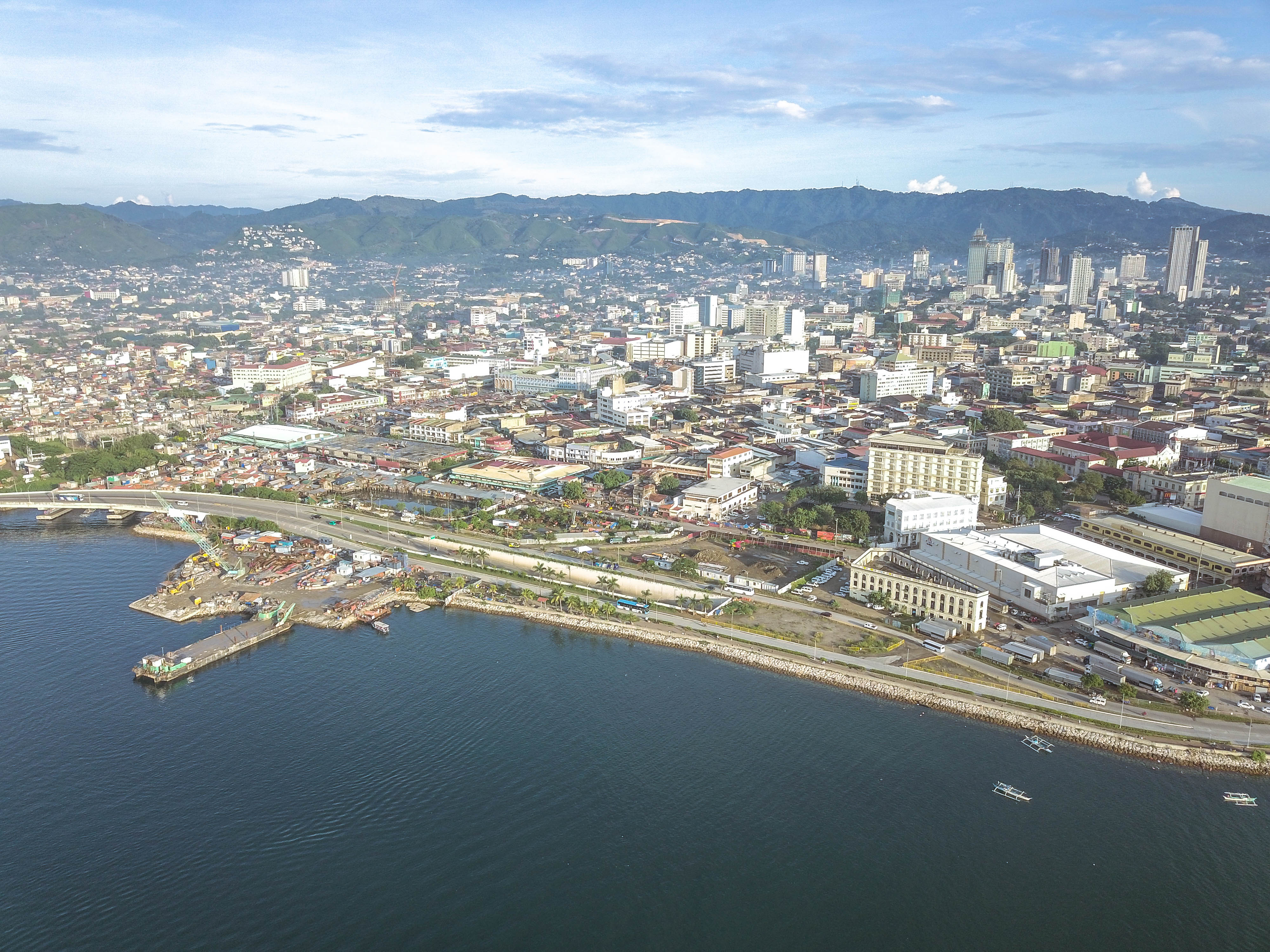
- Cebu City, the financial centre of Cebu
- Currency: Philippine peso (₱)

Statistics
- Population: ▲5,238,915
- GDP: ▲$6.704 billion (nominal, 2021 est.)
- GDP rank: 2nd (nominal, 2021 est.)
- GDP growth: ▲5.4% (2021)
- GDP per capita: ▲$1,279 (nominal, 2021 est.)
- GDP by sector: Agriculture: 3.7%; Industry: 2.3%; Services: 6.4%; (2020)
- Inflation (CPI): 11.6% (September 2022 est.)
- Population at risk of poverty: 14.76% below poverty line (2018 est.)
- Human Development Index: ▲0.740 high (2019)
- Unemployment: 6.37% (2022)
- All values, unless otherwise stated, are in US dollars.

The economy of the Province of Cebu is the 2nd largest in the Philippines according to the Philippine Statistics Authority. In 2021, the Cebuano's combined economy peaked at P869.9 billion, making it the 2nd largest in the nation next to Laguna P922.3.

According to COA, Cebu has been currently reigning as one of the most populous province and the richest province in the region for 8 consecutive times.

== Ceboom ==
"Ceboom" is a combination of the term Cebu and boom. It is primarily described the province's rapid economical development in 1990. Before the event of Ceboom, Cebu was primarily crossed by Typhoon Mike. It damaged thousands of houses in Cordova and leaving ships sinking. After the incident, renovation and construction were started and two major shopping companies opened in Cebu, ShoeMart or SM (now as SMPH) and Ayala opened that period. More projects were proposed and the Marcelo Fernan Bridge was constructed then after.

== See also ==
- Cebu City
