= North Reclamation Area =

Reclamation area in Cebu, Philippines

- Central business district
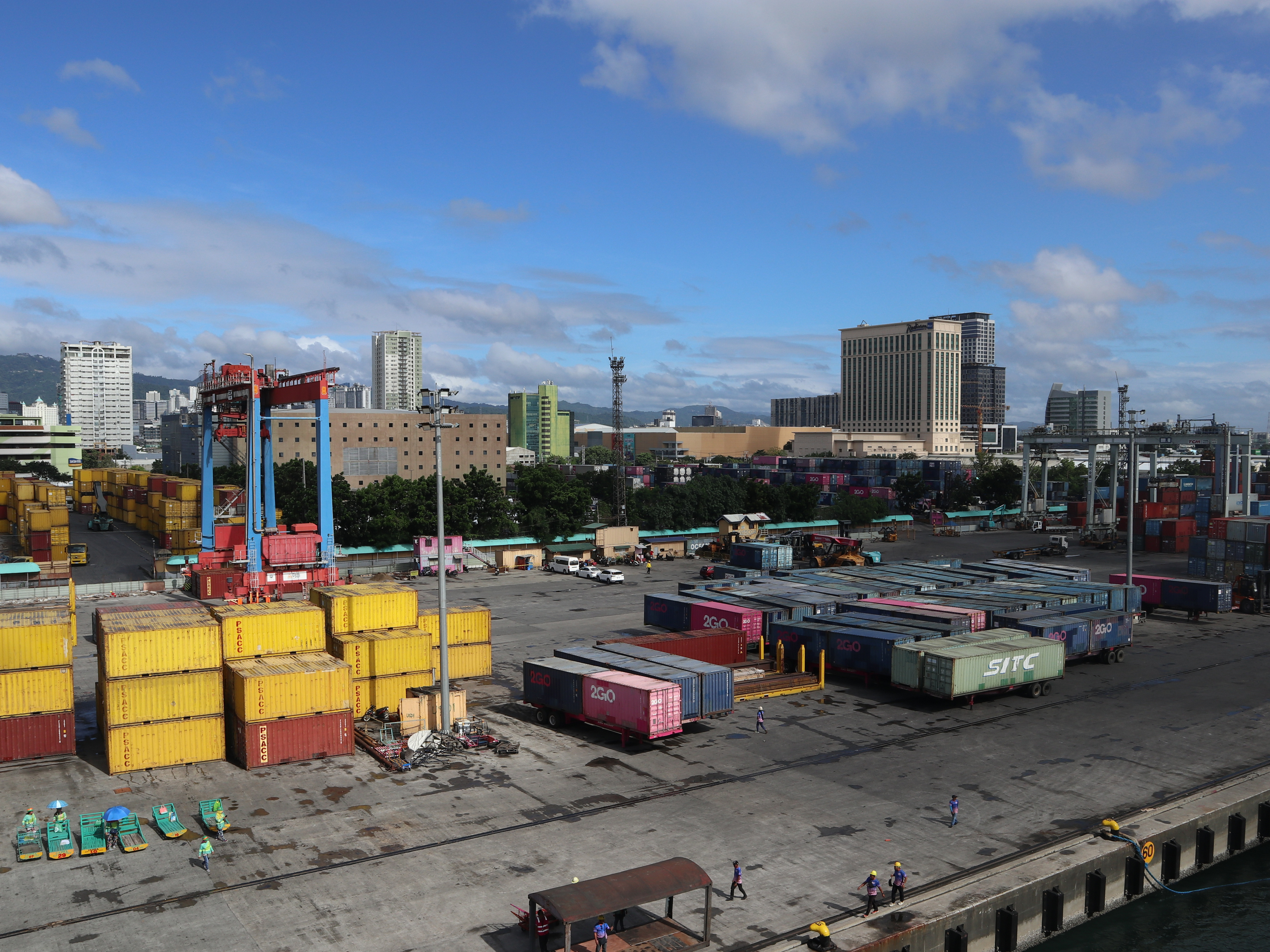
- Pier 6 of the Cebu Port in the North Reclamation Area
- Country: Philippines
- Region: Central Visayas
- Metropolitan area: Metro Cebu
- Cities: Cebu City; Mandaue

Area
  - Total: 191 ha (470 acres)
- Time zone: UTC+8 (PST)

The North Reclamation Area, also known as the North Special Administrative Zone, is a 191 ha (470 acres) reclamation area located in both Cebu City and Mandaue, Cebu, Philippines. The reclaimed area, situated in the Mactan Channel, is located off the southern coasts of Mandaue, and the northern coasts of Cebu City, spanning two cities as well as major barangays such as Mabolo and Subangdaku.

== History ==
The proposal of the North Reclamation Area began back in the 1960s, wherein a local contracting company, Essel, Inc., entered into an agreement with the Cebu City government in a proposal to reclaim the foreshore area of Pier 3 of the Port of Cebu and the Subangdaku River. Actual reclamation works began in late 1962, and works completed by 1967, pushing the reclamation area to 169 hectares (420 acres).

== Developments ==
=== Cebu International Convention Center ===
The Cebu International Convention Center (CICC), is a three-story convention center situated on a 3.8 ha (9.4 acres) portion of land in the Mandaue North Reclamation Area. Originally was planned to be a megadome, the idea was stalled after some members of the provincial board opposed it. Construction and groundbreaking of the convention center began on April 7, 2006.

The completion of the convention center ended in December 2006, and as the province became the host of the 12th ASEAN Summit, and the moved 2nd East Asia Summit, the Cebu provincial government handed over the convention center to the national organizing committee for the ASEAN Summit following its completion.

=== Bai Hotel Cebu ===
Bai Hotel Cebu is a 668-room hotel located in the Mandaue North Reclamation Area. The hotel stands at a 72,000 square metres (780,000 sq ft) property and stands 23-stories high. It is the largest hotel in Visayas by room capacity.

The soft opening of the hotel began on September 27, 2018, opening 200 rooms out of its 668-room capacity. The grand opening of the hotel was held on November 23 of that year, commencing full operations of the hotel.

=== Chong Hua Hospital Mandaue and Cancer Center ===
Chong Hua Hospital Mandaue and Cancer Center is a 300-bed hospital located in the Mandaue North Reclamation Area. The hospital is situated on a 1.5-hectare (3.7-acre) property and consists of two buildings. The 300-bed hospital broke ground on September 29, 2012, and opened on February 18, 2016.
