= Lapu-Lapu Expressway =

Expressway in Cordova

Route information
- Maintained by Lapu-Lapu Expressway Corp.
- Length: 12 km (7.5 mi)

Location
- Country: Philippines
- Major cities: Lapu-Lapu City

Highway system
- Roads in the Philippines; Highways; Expressways; List

The Lapu-Lapu Expressway (LLEX), is a proposed 12-kilometre-long (7.5 mi) elevated expressway in Lapu-Lapu City, Cebu, Philippines. The expressway, once completed, will connect Mactan–Cebu International Airport in Lapu-Lapu City to the Cebu–Cordova Link Expressway (CCLEX) in the nearby municipality of Cordova. The project is designed to cut travel time between the Mactan–Cebu International Airport and Cebu City, and to maintain traffic congestion in the city and the crowding of motorists in the city's main highway.

The expressway is set to be operational by 2025. Once completed, the expressway is projected to serve 50,000 vehicles per day.

Construction and ground-breaking of the expressway was expected to start in September 2023, but necessary permits were still needed to be complied before the civil works of the Lapu-Lapu Expressway will start. The start of construction was instead targeted by the first quarter of 2024.

The project is estimated to cost ₱24.8 billion, and will be built under a public-private partnership model.

== Route description ==
The 12-kilometre elevated expressway aims to connect Mactan–Cebu International Airport to the Cebu–Cordova Link Expressway, which connects to the South Road Properties (SRP) in Cebu City, and cut travel time by seven minutes. The expressway will pass through several barangays of Lapu-Lapu City. Starting at Barangay Babag, passing through the Mactan Economic Zone (MEPZ), Mactan Aviation Road, Barangay Pajac, Buaya, Bankal, Ibo and ending in Pusok. The expressway will include exits to the barangays, resorts, and communities in the city.

== Features ==
=== Operation ===
The expressway will be operated and maintained as a toll road by the Lapu-Lapu Expressway Corporation, a consortium between Premium Megastructure Inc. (PMI), MTD Philippines, and Ulticon Builders Inc, for the next 35 years. The project will be built via a public–private partnership (PPP) scheme, between the Lapu-Lapu Expressway Corporation and the Lapu-Lapu City Government.
