= Lapu-Lapu City =

Highly urbanized city in Central Visayas, Philippines

Lapu-Lapu City Opon
- Highly urbanized city
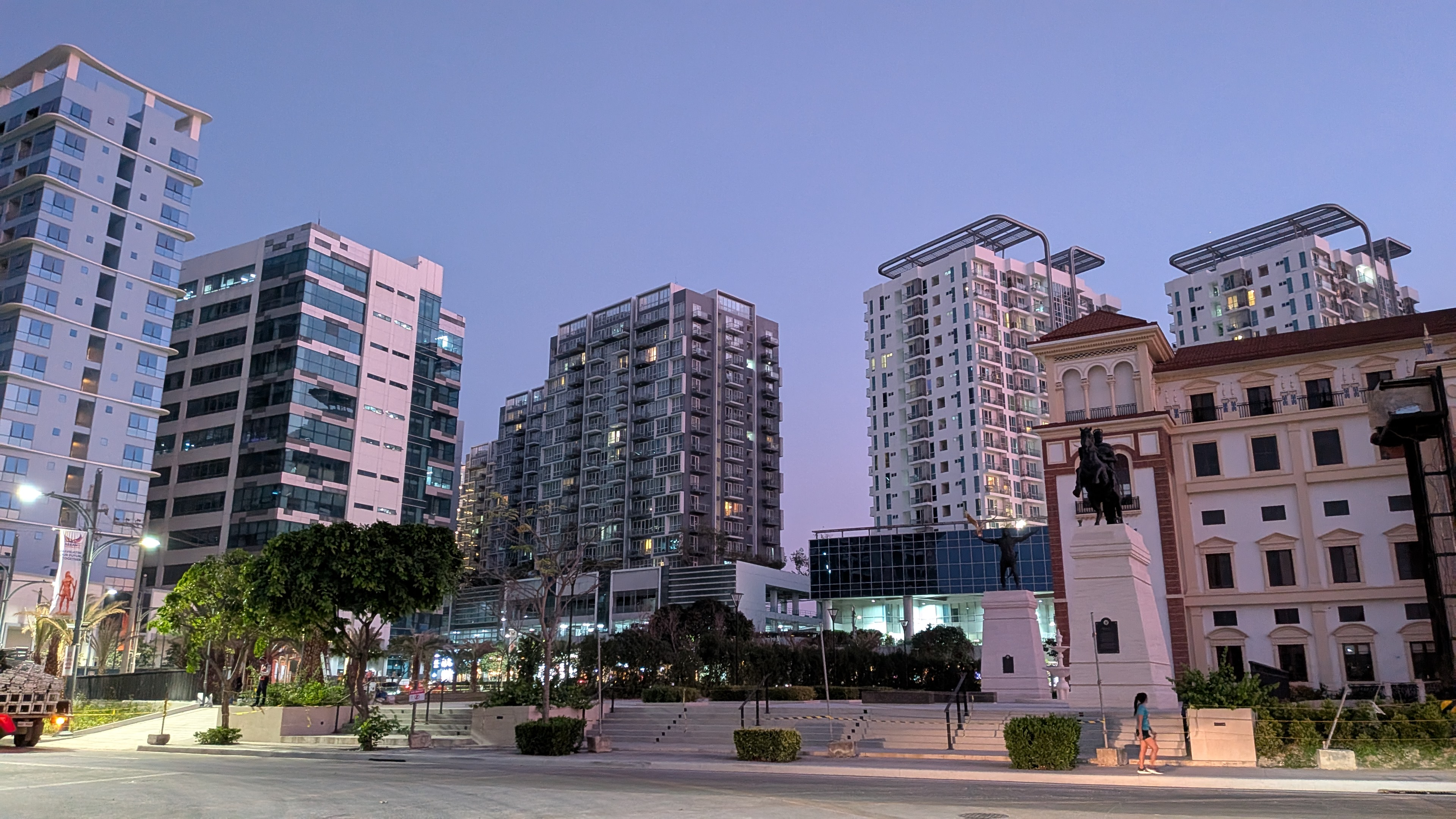
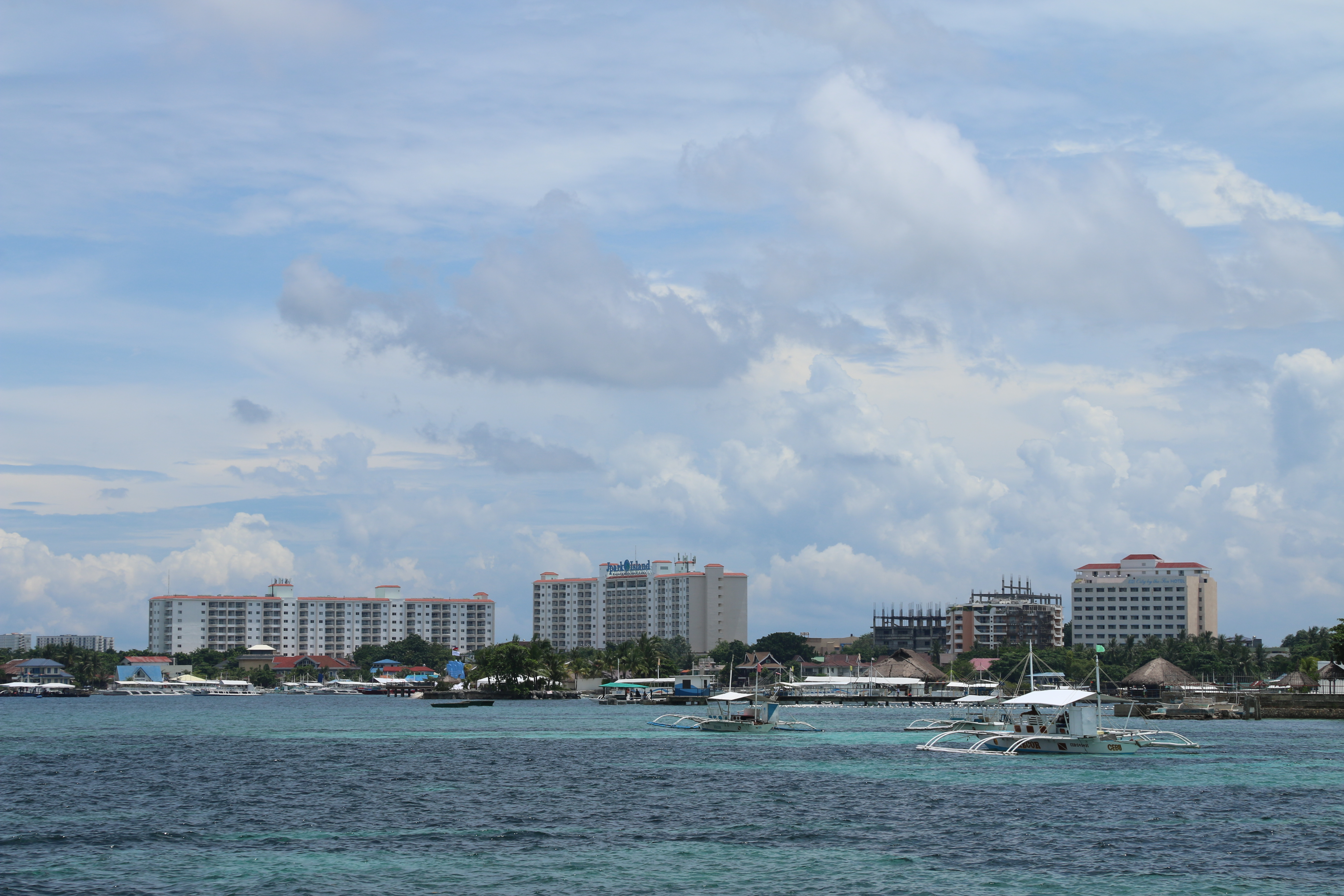
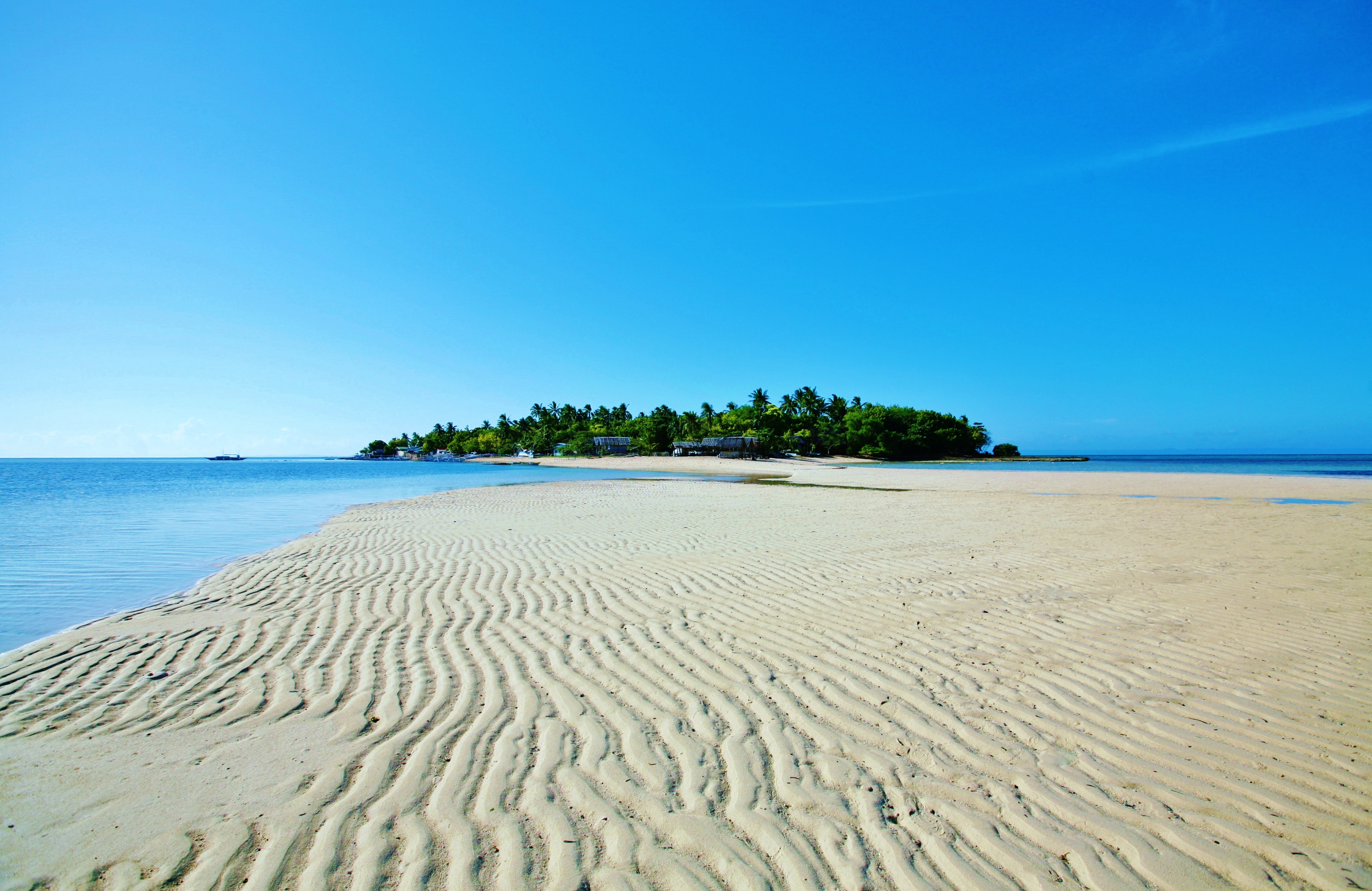
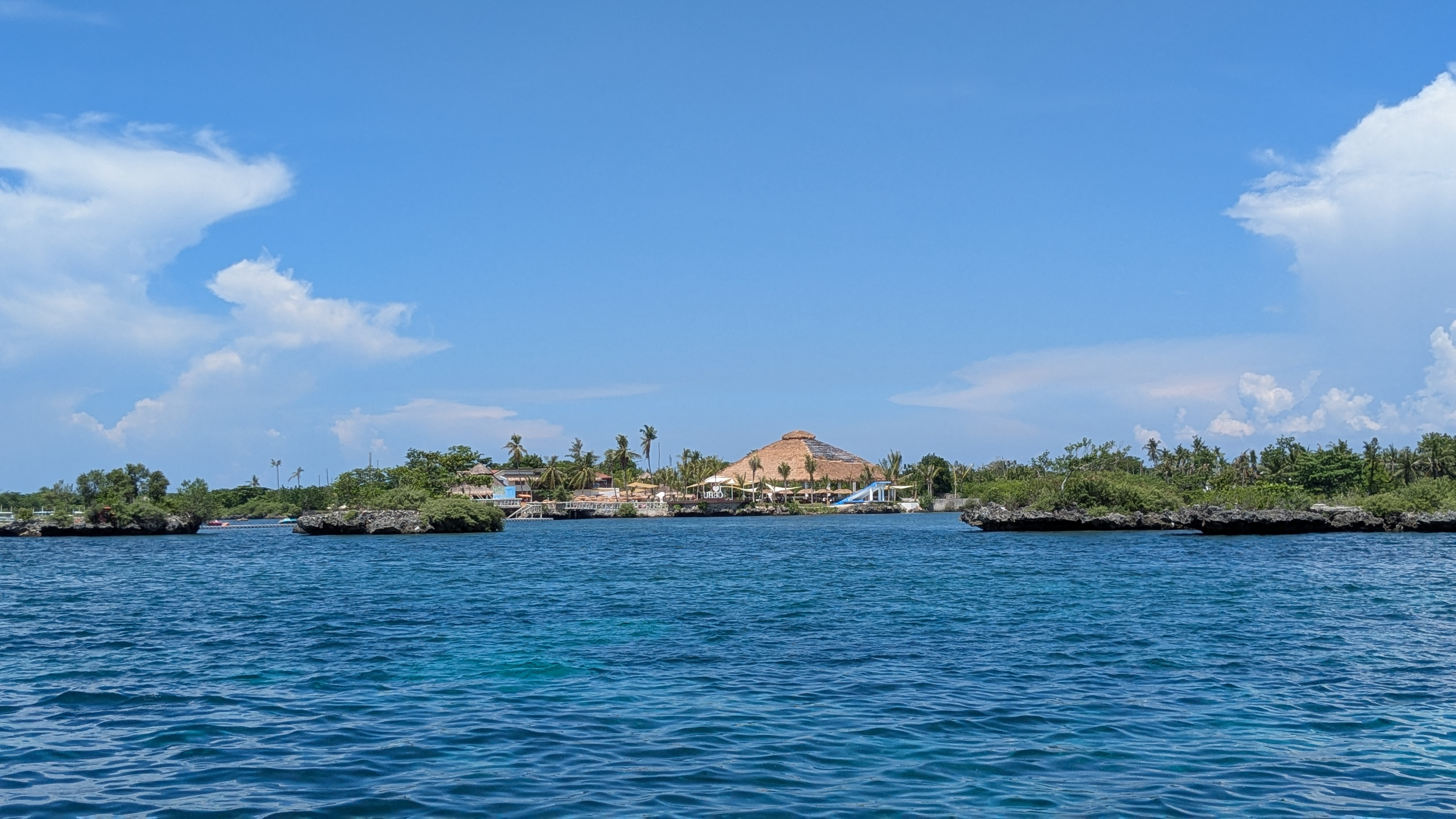
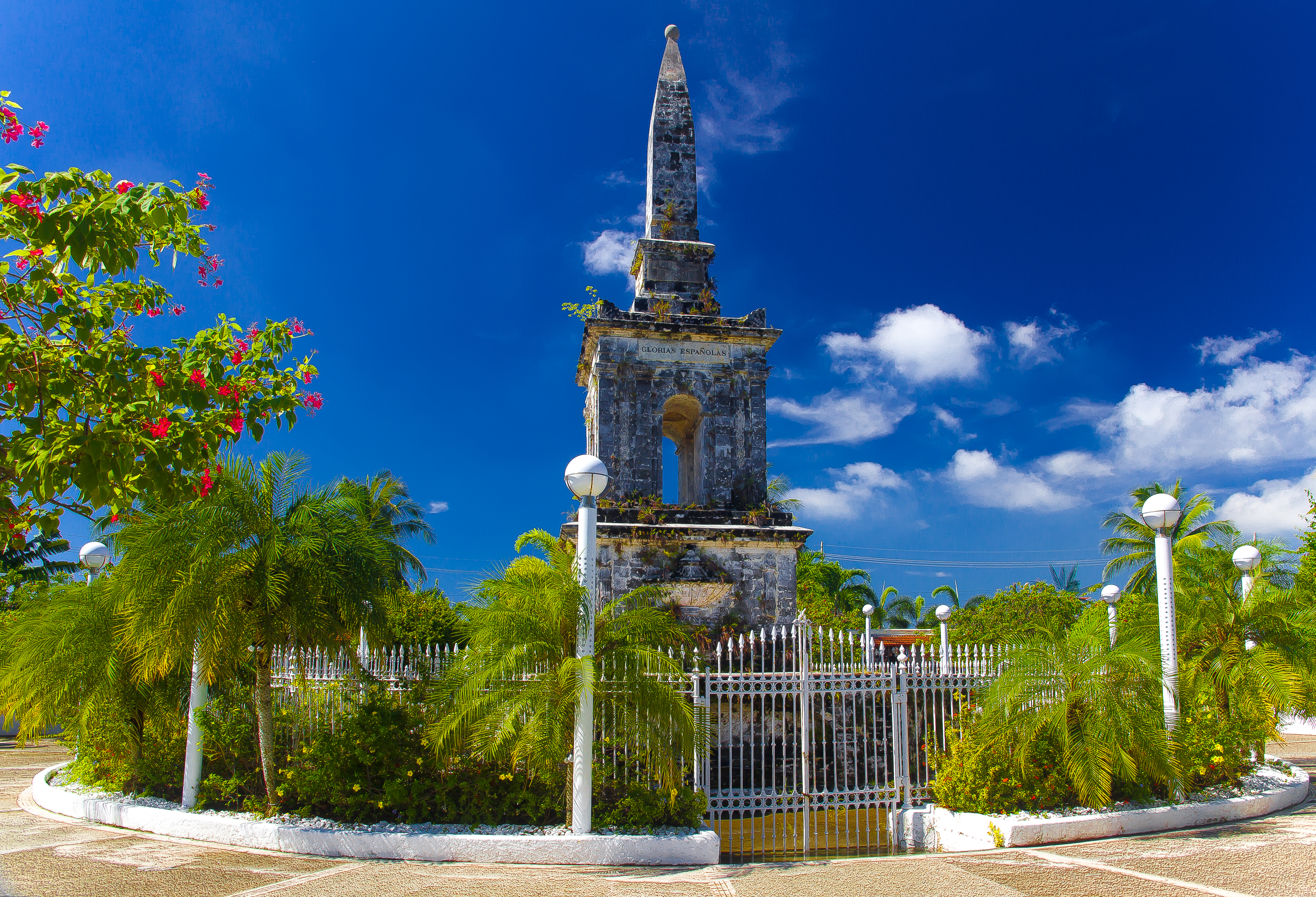
- Left to right, from the top: Mactan Newtown, Mactan Shrine, Mactan–Cebu International Airport, Jpark Island Resort & Waterpark, Caohagan Island, Olango Island, and Magellan Monument

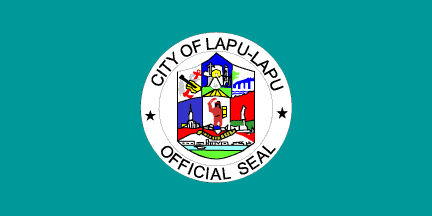
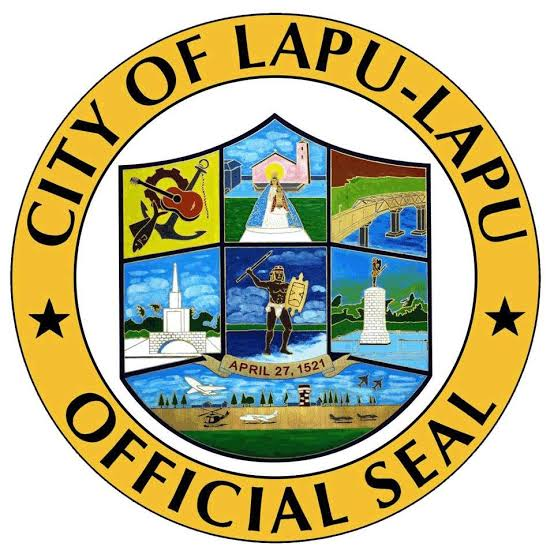
- Flag Seal
- Nicknames: Historic Resort City; Guitar Capital of the Philippines
- Anthem: Dakbayan sa Sidlakan (City of the East)
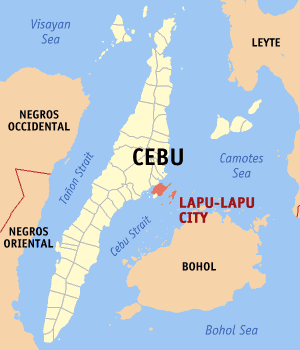
- Map of Central Visayas with Lapu-Lapu City highlighted
- Interactive map of Lapu-Lapu City
- Location within the Philippines
- Coordinates: 10°18′46″N 123°56′56″E
- Country: Philippines
- Region: Central Visayas
- Province: Cebu (An independent, highly urbanized city that collaborates with the provincial government of Cebu.)
- District: Lone district
- Founded (Opon): 1730
- Cityhood and renamed: June 17, 1961
- Highly urbanized city: January 23, 2007
- Named for: Lapulapu
- Barangays: 30 (see Barangays)

Government
  - Type: Sangguniang Panlungsod
  - Mayor: Ma. Cynthia K. Chan (Lakas)
  - Vice Mayor: Celedonio B. Sitoy (PFP)
  - Representative: Junard "Ahong" Q. Chan (PFP)
  - City Council: Members: Rufo Y. Bering; Annabeth D. Cuizon; Marciano A. Alforque Jr.; Celestino C. Aying; Linda Susan C. Baring; Jan Vincent A. Dela Serna; Efren T. Herrera; Ariane Neil Marie Yap; Climaco A. Tatoy Jr.; Jeorgen Eyas-Book; Joseph T. Pangantungan; Emilio L. Galaroza Jr.
  - Electorate: 277,288 voters (2025)

Area
  - Total: 58.10 km^{2} (22.43 sq mi)
- Elevation: 70 m (230 ft)

Population (2024 census)
  - Total: 497,813
  - Density: 8,568/km^{2} (22,190/sq mi)
  - Households: 129,652
- Demonym: Oponganon

Economy
  - Gross domestic product: ₱151.4 billion (2022) $2.675 billion (2022)
  - Income class: 1st city income class
  - Poverty incidence: 8.6% (2023)
  - Revenue: ₱ 4,098 million (2024)
  - Assets: ₱ 11,761 million (2024)
  - Expenditure: ₱ 2,324 million (2024)

Service provider
  - Electricity: Mactan Electric Company (MECO)
  - Water: Metropolitan Cebu Water District (MCWD)
- Time zone: UTC+8 (Philippine Standard Time (PST))
- ZIP code: 6015, 6016 (Mactan–Cebu International Airport)
- PSGC: 0731100000
- IDD : area code: +63 (0)32
- Native language: Cebuano

Lapu-Lapu, officially the City of Lapu-Lapu (Cebuano: Dakbayan sa Lapu-Lapu; Filipino: Lungsod ng Lapu-Lapu), is a highly urbanized city in the Central Visayas region of the Philippines. According to the 2024 census, it has a population of 497,813 people.

It was formerly known as Opon, which was changed to its present name in 1961. It is one of the cities that make up Metro Cebu in the Philippines. It is located in the province of Cebu, administratively independent from the province, but grouped under Cebu by the Philippine Statistics Authority (PSA) and also the second most populous city of that province and in Central Visayas after the capital city of Cebu.

The second busiest airport in the Philippines, Mactan–Cebu International Airport, is located in Lapu-Lapu City. It opened in 1966 and serves as a hub for Philippine Airlines, and as an operating base for Cebu Pacific and Philippines AirAsia.

== History ==
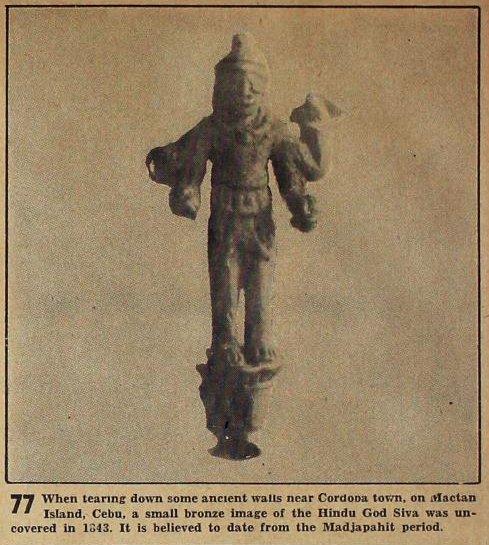
A picture of a Bronze Image of the Hindu god Shiva (lost during World War II), found in Mactan, demonstrating the area as having been Hindu and Indianized.

The island of Mactan was already a thriving settlement before it was colonized by Spain in the 16th century. It was a strong ally of the Lakanate of Lawan, a prosperous kingdom in Samar. Datu Hadi Iberein ruled the Lakanate of Lawan. He was described by historian William Henry Scott as a "Samar datu by the name of Iberein was rowed out to a Spanish vessel anchored in his harbor in 1543 by oarsmen collared in gold; while wearing on his own person earrings and chains."

Magellan led a landing party of 49 men to force Lapulapu to submit to the authority of Spain. He and his men were confronted by some 1,500 Mactan warriors, who killed Ferdinand Magellan, along with several other members of his expedition.

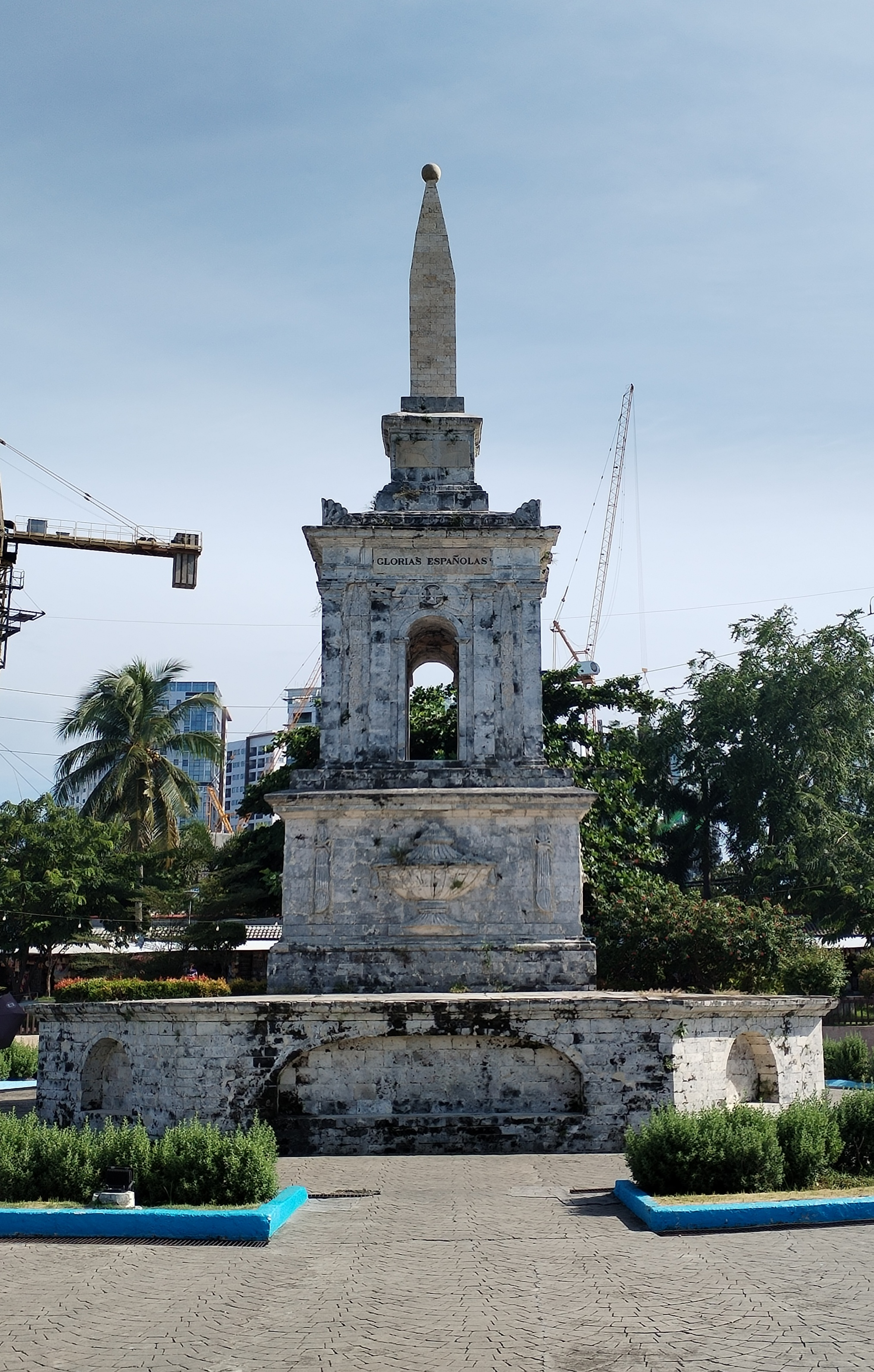
Magellan's Monument at Mactan Shrine

The municipality of Opon was founded by the Augustinian missionaries in 1730. It was ceded to the Jesuits in 1737, and later restored to the Augustinians. When the Philippine Revolution spread to the Visayas in 1898, the people organized themselves into local revolutionary units.

In the 16th century, Mactan Island was colonized by Spain. Augustinian friars re-founded the town of Opon as a Christian town in 1730, and it became a city in 1961. It was renamed after Datu Lapulapu, the island's chieftain, who led the defeat against the Portuguese explorer Ferdinand Magellan in 1521 in the Battle of Mactan, commemorated at Mactan Shrine in Barangay Mactan, where Magellan led a landing party of 40 men to resupply who were set upon by 1,500 locals and slew their captain and a few other men.

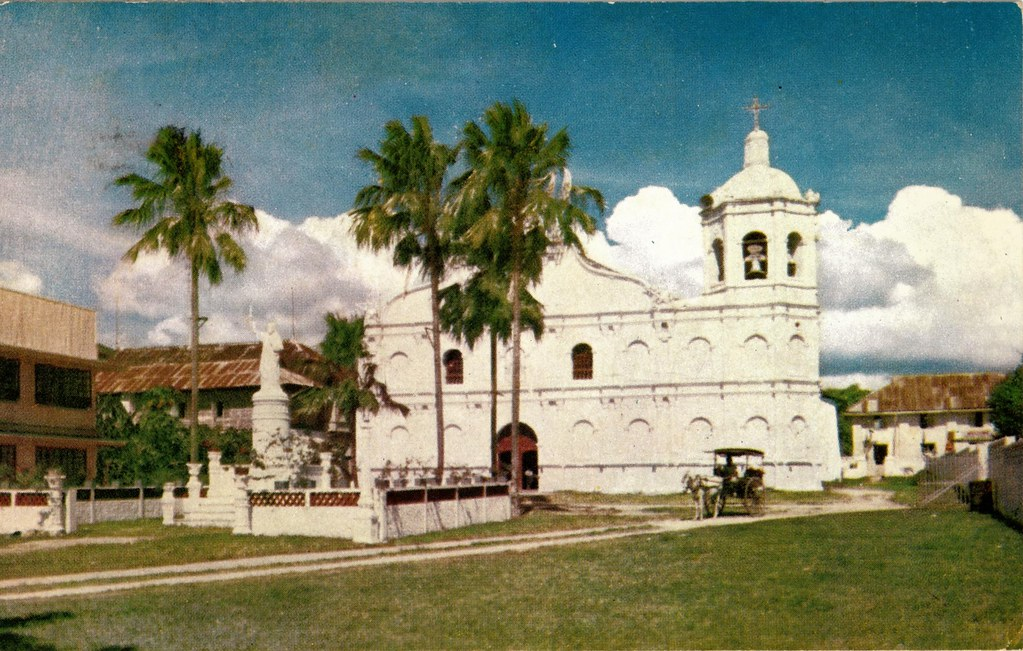
Old Opon Church, it is built in the unique Earthquake Baroque style, an architectural style derived from Mexican Baroque, but retrofitted to the earthquake-prone conditions of the Asian-Pacific country of the Philippines and the Latin-American nation of Guatemala. The Philippines is the only country in Asia holding architectural and cultural heritage colonially built by Latin-American peoples during the Spanish era and later during invasion by the USA, by Anglo-American peoples. Yet, despite being the most unique tourism destination among Asians for the American and Latino influences not available anywhere else in the continent, as the other Asian nations were colonized by Europeans instead, the number of tourists going to the Philippines from their Asian neighbors are negligible. Whereas in contrast, the Philippines is a top source of tourists going to its Asian neighbors.

During the Filipino-American War, a military government was established. The continued resistance of the people of Cebu prompted the American government to restore military control over the province on July 17, 1901. In 1905, Opon held its first municipal election, and Pascual dela Serna was elected town president. Following the outbreak of World War II, the presence of bulk oil storage tanks in Opon made the town an object of Japanese raids a week after the outbreak of WWII in December 1941. The enemy aircraft succeeded in blowing up two of about fourteen oil storage tanks in Opon. A unit of the Kawaguchi Detachment of the Japanese Imperial Forces landed on the east coast of Cebu on April 10, 1942. Later, the resistance movement was organized by Colonel James M. Cushing, leader of the southern and central units, and Harry Fenton of the northern unit of the Cebu Resistance Movement.

During the Battle of the Visayas, Victor II operations of the American Division led by Major General William Arnold landed in Cebu on March 26, 1945, and subsequently liberated the province.

Historically, the city includes the site of the Battle of Mactan. On August 1, 1973, by virtue of Presidential Decree No. 2060, President Ferdinand Marcos declared the site of the battle a national shrine; the preservation, restoration and/or reconstruction of which shall be under the supervision and control of the National Historical Commission in collaboration with the Department of Tourism. Mactan is also the birthplace of Leonila Dimataga-Garcia, wife of Carlos P. Garcia, the fourth President of the Republic. Leonila Dimataga-Garcia was a relative of the wife of Lapu-Lapu City's former mayor Ernest Weigel Jr. (1992–2001, three terms) who was the richest mayor in Metro Cebu, with a net worth of ₱57 million in the early 2000s.

=== Cityhood ===
Congressman Manuel A. Zosa, the representative of the Sixth District of Cebu, sponsored the Bill converting the former municipality of Opon into the present day city of Lapu-Lapu. This was the Republic Act 3134, known as the City Charter of Lapu-Lapu, which was signed on June 17, 1961, by Philippine President Carlos P. Garcia. Lapu-Lapu was inaugurated on December 31, 1961, with Mariano Dimataga, the last municipal mayor, as the first city mayor.

Secretary Lucas Bersamin signed Proclamation No. 558 which declared June 17 a special public holiday to commemorate the city's 63rd charter anniversary. Republic Act 3134, the "City Charter of Lapu-Lapu" was signed on June 17, 1961, by Carlos P. Garcia.

==== Highly urbanized city ====
On January 23, 2007, Lapu-Lapu was proclaimed as HUC via Proclamation No. 1222, signed by President Gloria Macapagal Arroyo. Its plebiscite was held along with Puerto Princesa in Palawan on July 21, 2007. Both of them successfully became highly urbanized cities after majority of their voters voted in favor of conversion. They ranked 31st and 32nd in the country.

== Geography ==
Lapu-Lapu is bounded on the north by the main island of Cebu, to the west by Cebu City and Mactan Channel, on the east by the Camotes Sea, and on the south by the town of Cordova.

The city occupies Mactan Island, a few kilometers off the main island of Cebu. It also has some of the barangays under its jurisdiction on the Olango Island Group. The city is linked to Mandaue on mainland Cebu by the Mactan-Mandaue Bridge and Marcelo Fernan Bridges.

=== Barangays ===
Lapu-Lapu is politically subdivided into 30 barangays. Each barangay consists of puroks and some have sitios.

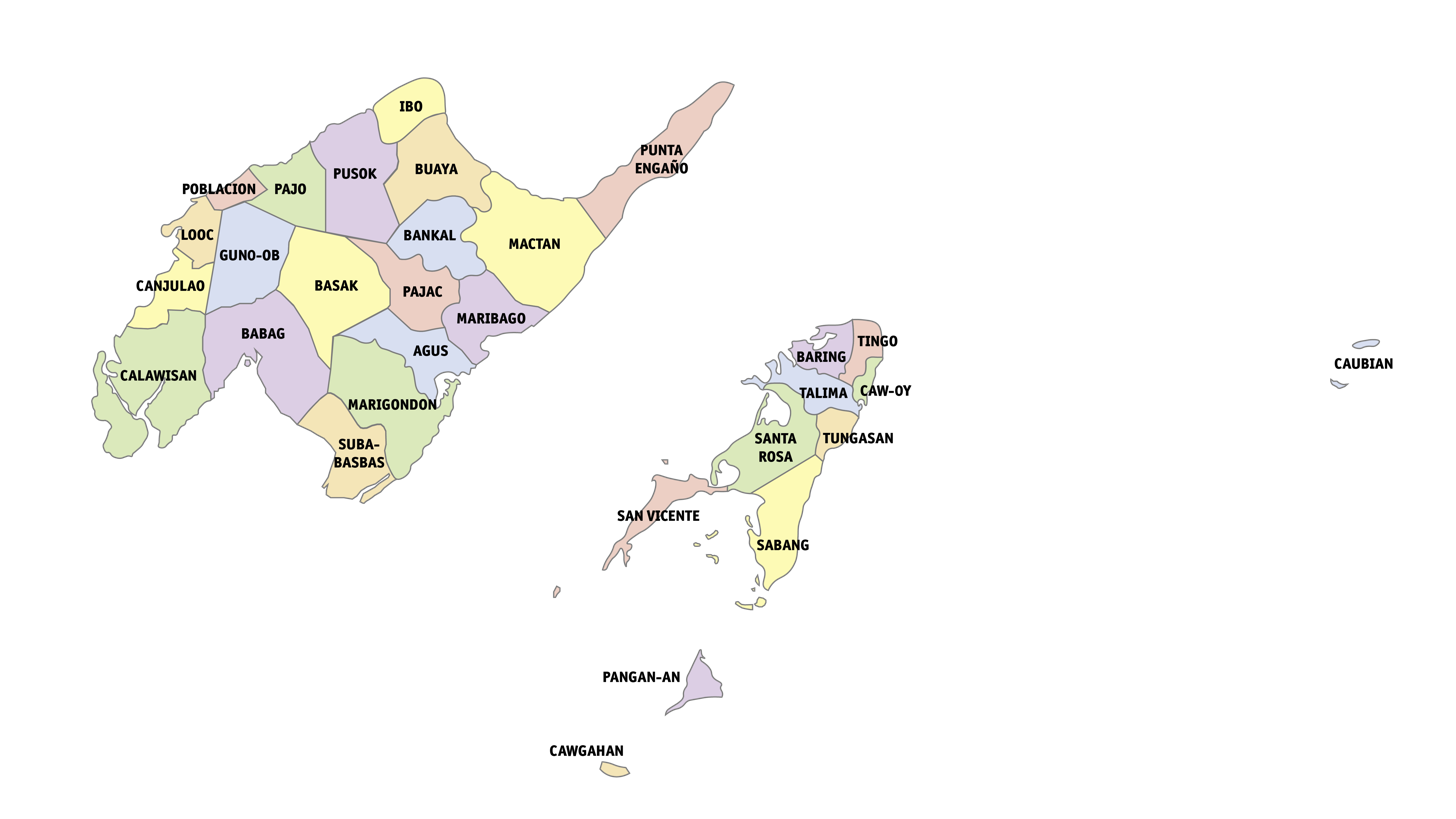
Political map of Lapu-Lapu

PSGC	Barangay	Population			±% p.a.		Area		PD 2024	
		2024		2010			ha	acre	/km^{2}	/sq mi
072226001	Agus	3.9%	19,525	15,767	▴	1.49%				
072226002	Babag	6.2%	30,839	22,756	▴	2.12%	307	759	10,000	26,000
072226003	Bankal	4.6%	22,863	20,872	▴	0.63%	201	497	11,000	29,000
072226004	Baring	0.8%	3,870	3,353	▴	0.99%	91	225	4,300	11,000
072226005	Basak	14.5%	71,990	59,873	▴	1.28%	603	1,490	12,000	31,000
072226006	Buaya	3.8%	19,078	16,072	▴	1.19%	271	670	7,000	18,000
072226007	Calawisan	3.2%	15,740	11,454	▴	2.22%	957	2,365	1,600	4,300
072226008	Canjulao	2.9%	14,451	13,245	▴	0.60%	156	385	9,300	24,000
072226011	Caubian	0.5%	2,429	2,272	▴	0.46%				
072226009	Caw‑oy	0.4%	2,226	1,837	▴	1.33%	162,900	402,542	1.4	3.5
072226010	Cawhagan	0.1%	694	638	▴	0.58%	55,900	138,134	1.2	3.2
072226012	Gun‑ob	7.6%	37,989	31,219	▴	1.36%				
072226013	Ibo	1.7%	8,318	8,126	▴	0.16%				
072226014	Looc	3.1%	15,411	16,016	▾	−0.27%				
072226015	Mactan	10.2%	50,964	33,465	▴	2.95%				
072226016	Maribago	3.8%	18,954	16,591	▴	0.92%				
072226017	Marigondon	5.1%	25,584	19,713	▴	1.82%				
072226018	Pajac	4.4%	22,116	17,402	▴	1.67%				
072226019	Pajo	5.2%	25,845	20,999	▴	1.44%				
072226020	Pangan‑an	0.5%	2,348	2,070	▴	0.87%				
072226021	Poblacion (Note: Part of the Poblacion barangay is still called Opon.)	1.3%	6,238	5,581	▴	0.77%				
072226022	Punta Engaño	2.3%	11,425	8,753	▴	1.86%				
072226024	Pusok	6.6%	32,791	28,810	▴	0.90%				
072226025	Sabang	1.4%	6,910	6,091	▴	0.87%				
072226031	San Vicente	0.8%	4,209	3,854	▴	0.61%				
072226026	Santa Rosa	1.1%	5,388	4,302	▴	1.57%				
072226027	Subabasbas	1.6%	7,961	6,288	▴	1.64%				
072226028	Talima	1.2%	5,973	5,734	▴	0.28%				
072226029	Tingo	0.6%	3,231	3,088	▴	0.31%				
072226030	Tungasan	0.5%	2,244	1,871	▴	1.26%				
	Total		497,813	350,467	▴	2.45%	5,810	14,357	8,600	14

=== Climate ===
Climate data for Lapu-Lapu
Month	Jan	Feb	Mar	Apr	May	Jun	Jul	Aug	Sep	Oct	Nov	Dec	Year
Mean daily maximum °C (°F)	28 (82)	29 (84)	30 (86)	31 (88)	31 (88)	30 (86)	30 (86)	30 (86)	30 (86)	29 (84)	29 (84)	28 (82)	30 (85)
Mean daily minimum °C (°F)	23 (73)	23 (73)	23 (73)	24 (75)	25 (77)	25 (77)	25 (77)	25 (77)	25 (77)	25 (77)	24 (75)	23 (73)	24 (75)
Average precipitation mm (inches)	70 (2.8)	49 (1.9)	62 (2.4)	78 (3.1)	138 (5.4)	201 (7.9)	192 (7.6)	185 (7.3)	192 (7.6)	205 (8.1)	156 (6.1)	111 (4.4)	1,639 (64.6)
Average rainy days	13.4	10.6	13.1	14.5	24.2	27.9	28.4	27.7	27.1	27.4	22.5	15.9	252.7
Source: Meteoblue (modeled/calculated data, not measured locally)

== Demographics ==
Population census of Lapu-Lapu City

Year	Pop.	±% p.a.
1903	14,851	—
1918	20,988	+2.33%
1939	33,426	+2.24%
1948	37,280	+1.22%
1960	48,546	+2.22%
1970	69,268	+3.61%

Year	Pop.	±% p.a.
1975	79,484	+2.80%
1980	98,324	+4.34%
1990	146,194	+4.05%
1995	173,744	+3.29%
2000	217,019	+4.88%
2007	292,530	+4.20%

Year	Pop.	±% p.a.
2010	350,467	+6.80%
2015	408,112	+2.94%
2020	497,604	+4.26%
2024	497,813	+0.01%

Source: Philippine Statistics Authority (PSA)

Lapu-Lapu's residents mainly speak Cebuano, the local language. Tagalog and English are also widely spoken and understood, due to the influx of foreign nationals in the city. Due to the large number of resorts and retirement homes in the city, as well as the growing number of ESL schools, the city also hosts a number of Japanese, Korean, and Chinese speakers.

== Economy ==
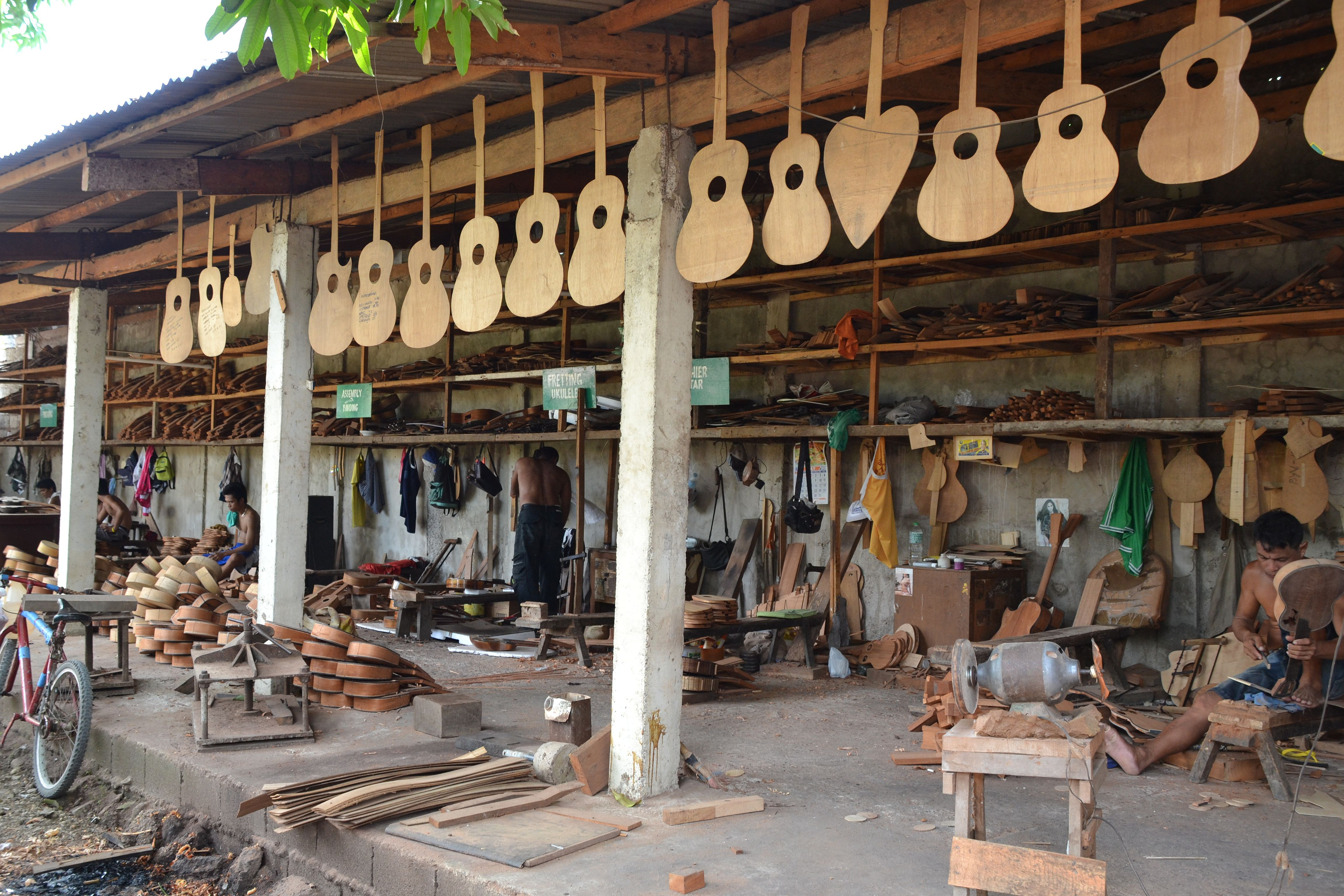
The city is known for its guitar making industry, known as "Opon Guitars"

Poverty incidence of Lapu-Lapu (%)

Source: Philippine Statistics Authority

Lapu-Lapu City is part of Metro Cebu, the second-most important metropolitan area in the Philippines. It has benefited from the economic rise of Cebu in the 1990s and 2000s, also known as Ceboom.

Mactan–Cebu International Airport, the primary airport serving Cebu, is located in the city. The airport has direct routes with international destinations, including East and Southeast Asia. These connections have given way for tourism to emerge as a major part of the city's economy. Several resorts are located in the city, most of which are concentrated along the eastern coast of the island in the barangays of Marigondon, Maribago, Mactan, and Punta Engaño.

The city is home to several industrial zones, such as Mactan Export Processing Zone (MEPZ) and the Cebu Light Industrial Park (CLIP). Other large industries include: General Milling Company, one of the largest food companies in the Philippines; the Cebu Shipyard and Engineering Works, pioneered by Dad Cleland; and several oil companies, such as Royal Dutch Shell.

Mactan Newtown, a 30-hectare (74-acre) integrated township currently being developed by Megaworld Corporation is also located in the city. Currently, it is home to business process outsourcing (BPO) offices, hotels, residential towers, a school, restaurants, retail shops, and a beach. Future developments include the Mactan Expo Center which is expected to open by the end of 2025, the Mactan World Museum that's expected to open in 2027, and additional residential towers.

== Government ==
Mayors of Lapu-Lapu City:

- 1938–1967: Mariano Dimataga
- 1968–1986: Maximo V. Patalinjug
- 1986–1988: Silvestre T. Dignos
- 1988–1991: Maximo V. Patalinjug
- 1992–2001: Ernest H. Weigel
- 2001–2010: Arturo O. Radaza
- 2010–2019: Paz C. Radaza
- 2019–2025: Junard Q. Chan
- 2025–present: Cynthia K. Chan

Mariano Dimataga's term was interrupted during the years 1941–1945. Teodulo Tomakin and later Eugenio Araneta were appointed as town mayors. They later escaped from the Japanese, Jorge Tampus took over. During the Allied liberation by the combined Filipino-American forces, year 1945 Mariano Dimataga resumed his interrupted term.

== Transportation ==
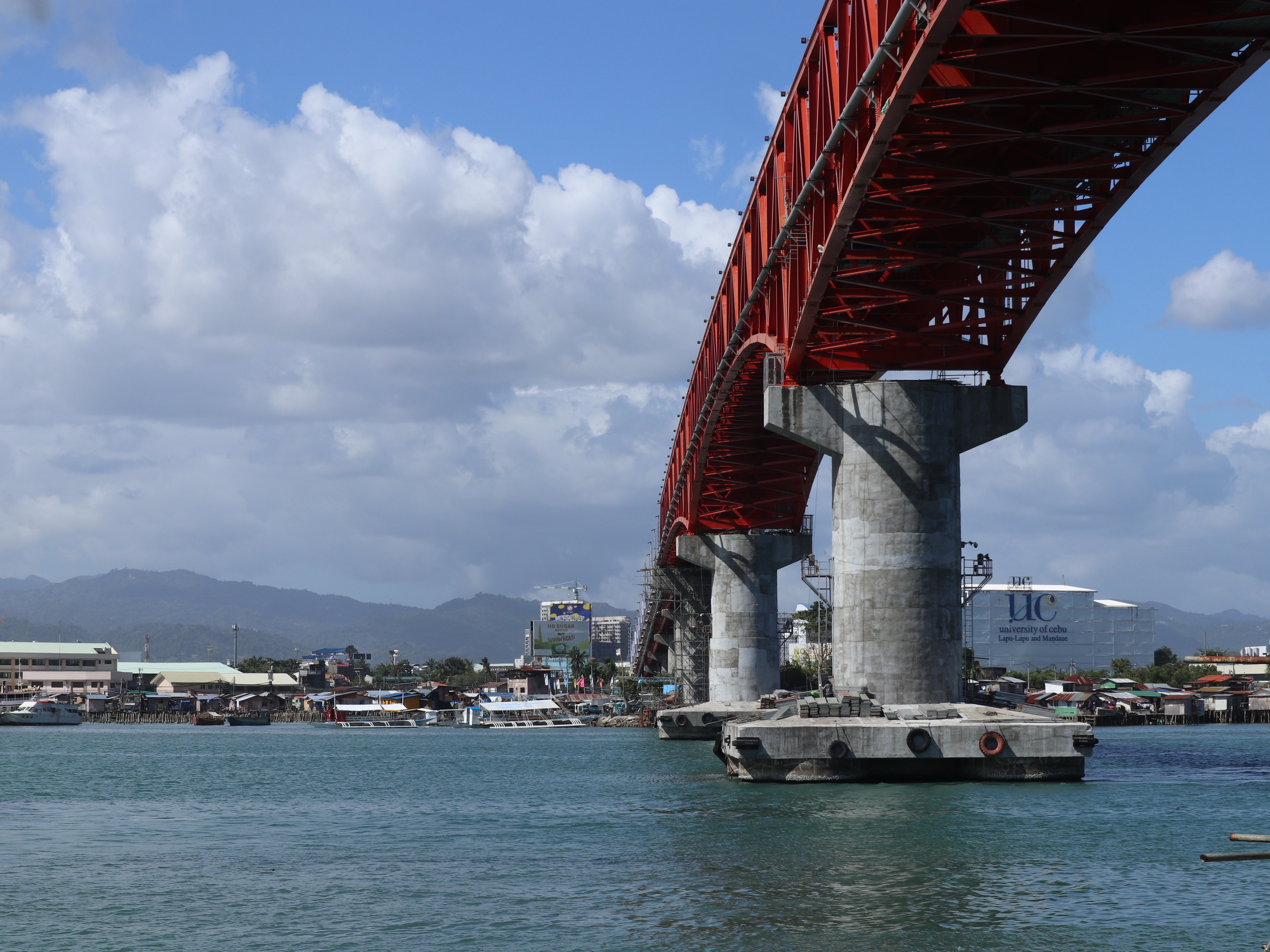
Serging Veloso Osmeña Bridge

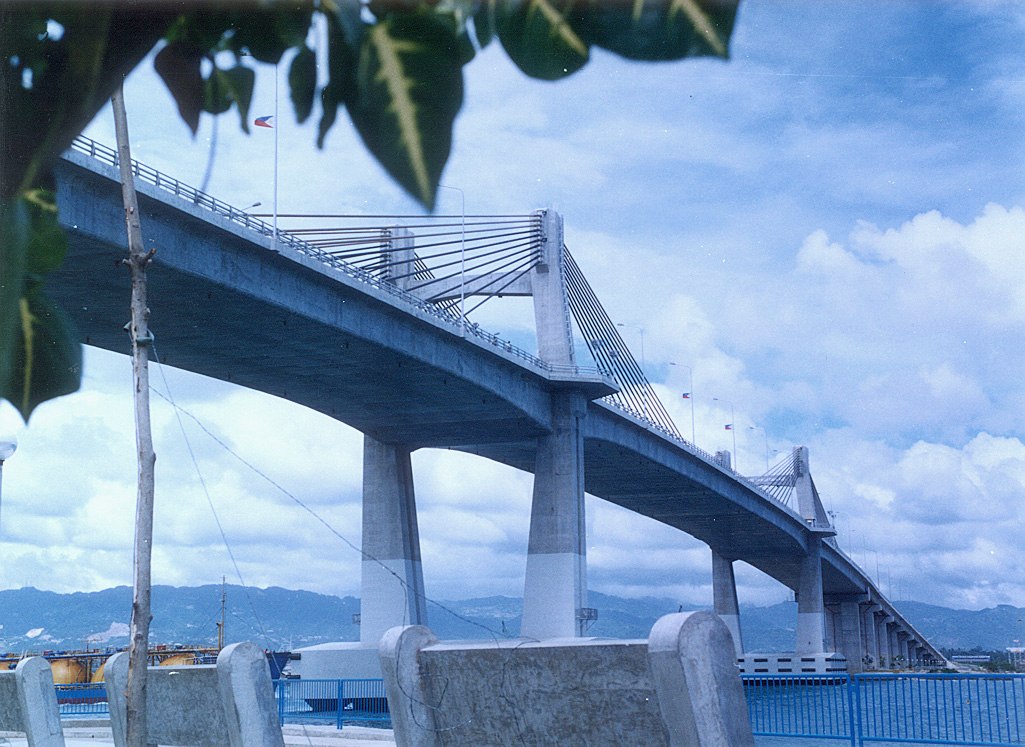
Marcelo Fernan Bridge

Lapu-Lapu City, positioned within the heart of Visayas, has an expansive transportation network. The city is connected to the mainland of Cebu by three major bridges: the Marcelo Fernan Bridge, Mactan-Mandaue Bridge, and the more recent addition of the Cebu–Cordova Link Expressway. These connections cross the sea channel separating the island of Mactan, where Lapu-Lapu City is located, from the island of Cebu.

The Mactan–Cebu International Airport (MCIA), located within Lapu-Lapu City, is the chief gateway serving the city of Cebu and the greater region of Central Visayas since its opening for civilian traffic in 1966. It hosts regular flights to numerous international destinations, particularly focusing on key cities in Asia. Some of these destinations include Singapore, Macau, Hong Kong, South Korea, Japan, and Taiwan. According to statistical reports, MCIA is ranked as the second busiest airport in the Philippines, only surpassed by Ninoy Aquino International Airport located in the capital, Manila. On an annual basis, MCIA handles over 10 million passengers and oversees more than 100,000 flights each year.

On the 63rd Charter Anniversary celebration at Hoops Dome, on June 17, Mayor Junard Chan announced the economic benefits of the P7.6-B 100-hectare mega land reclamation project creating a new commercial center, business hub, economic zone and recreation park. Aside from the Mactan Circumferential Road, he said, the under-construction, PHP24.8-billion Lapu-Lapu Expressway will connect the Cebu-Cordova Link Expressway to Mactan–Cebu International Airport. The Mactan–Mandaue Bridge will connect Barangay Ibo of Lapu-Lapu City to Mandaue City. Other infrastructure include the International Convention Center in Barangay Mactan, the Sudtunggan-Gabi bridge connecting Basak Cordova town.

== Military bases ==
Lapu-Lapu city hosts two military bases: Mactan–Benito Ebuen Air Base of the Philippine Air Force and Philippines Naval Forces Central - Naval Base Rafael Ramos of the Philippine Navy.

== Notable people ==
- Lapulapu - A chieftain of Mactan and the First Philippine National Hero who defeated Magellan.
- Akiko Solon - Finalist of Star Power: Sharon Search For the Next Female Superstar.
- Aiah Arceta - Member of Pinoy pop group Bini.
- Mariano de la Serna Dimataga – mayor of Lapu-Lapu City during several periods between 1938 and 1967; member of the De la Serna family.

== Sister cities ==
=== International ===
- Jinjiang, China
- Oarai, Japan
- Sanya, China

=== Local ===
- San Juan City

== See also ==
- List of renamed cities and municipalities in the Philippines

== Sources ==
- Gonzales, Glenda R (Dec 2004). "Metro Cebu: A Metropolitan Area in Need of Coordinative Body" (PDF). Discussion Paper. 2004-49. Philippine Institute for Development Studies (PIDS) / Surian sa mga Pag-aaral Pangkaunlaran ng Pilipinas. Archived from the original (PDF) on Mar 10, 2016.
