= Marcelo Fernan Bridge =

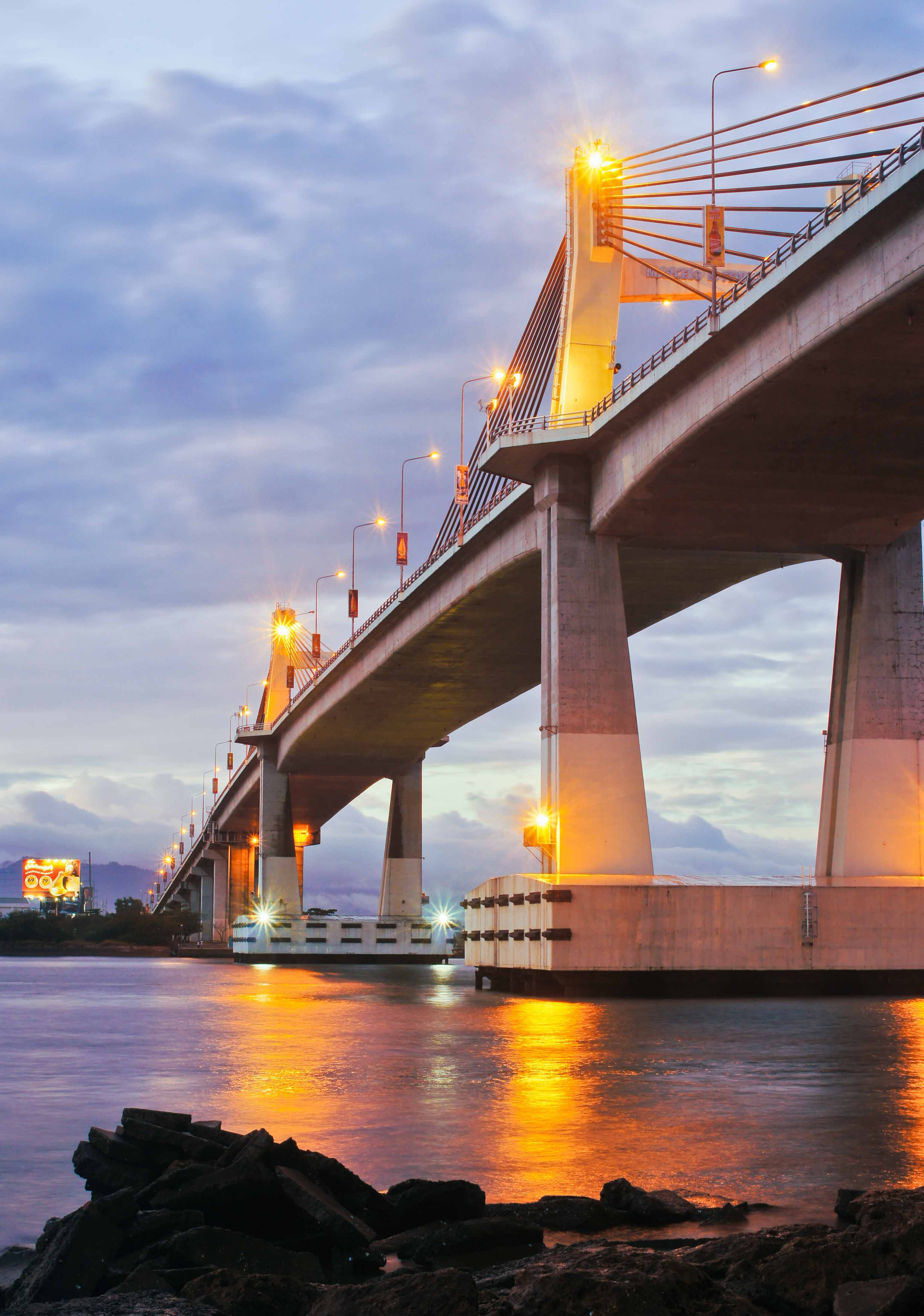
- The bridge in 2012
- Coordinates: 10°19′35.6″N 123°57′59.4″E
- Carries: 4 lanes of N841; pedestrian sidewalks
- Crosses: Mactan Channel
- Locale: Metro Cebu
- Other name(s): Second Cebu-Mactan Bridge (locally known); Consolacion Bridge (formerly)
- Named for: Marcelo Fernan
- Maintained by: Department of Public Works and Highways

Characteristics
- Design: Cable-stayed bridge
- Total length: 1,230.2 m (4,036 ft)
- Longest span: 185 m (607 ft)

History
- Designer: Katahira & Engineers International
- Constructed by: Kajima and Sumitomo Construction
- Construction start: October 18, 1996
- Construction end: 1999
- Opened: August 3, 1999

Location
- Interactive map of Marcelo Fernan Bridge

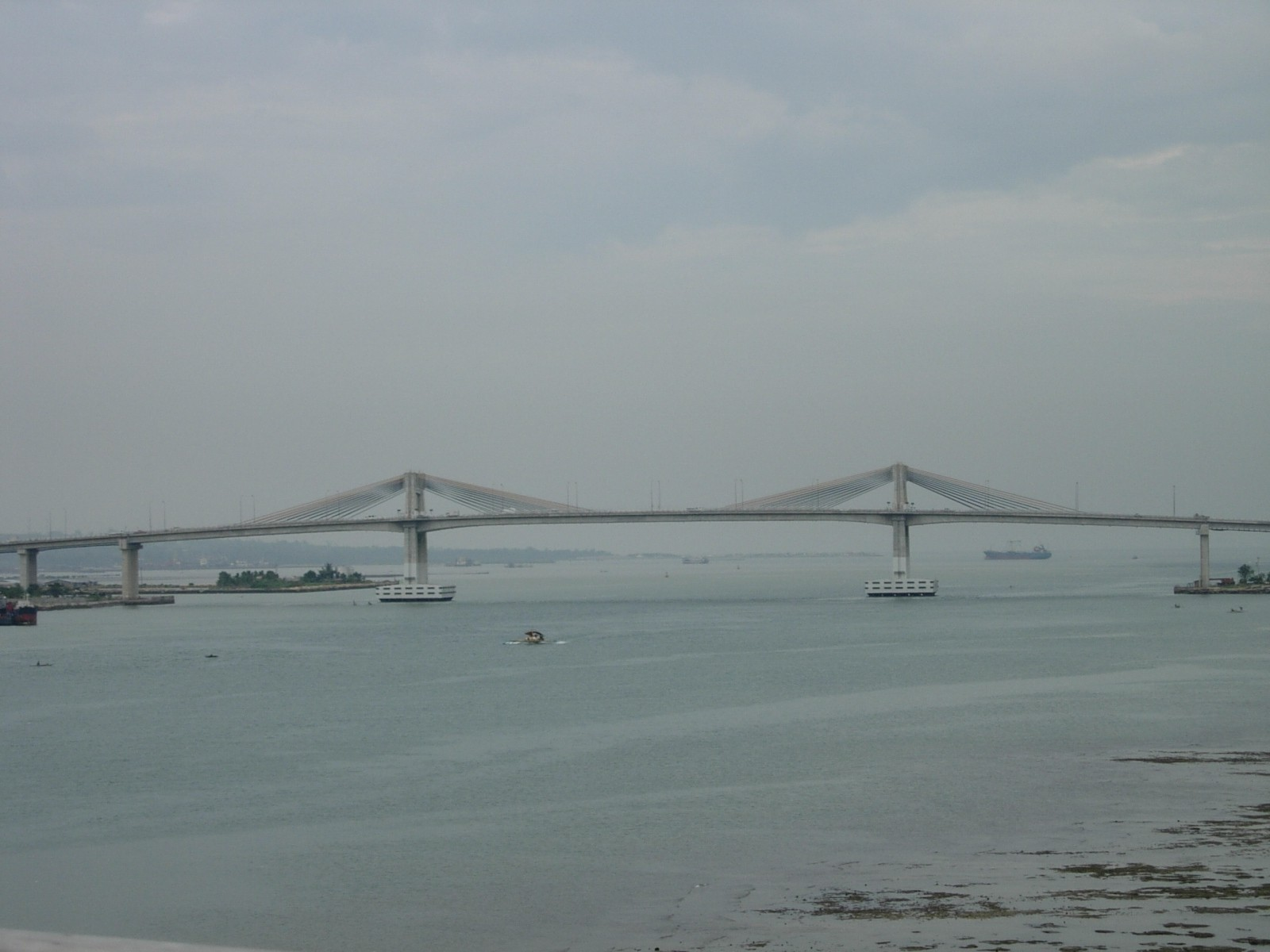
Marcelo Fernan Bridge over the Mactan Channel, viewed from the Sergio Osmeña Jr. Bridge.

The Marcelo Fernan Bridge, also known as the Second Cebu–Mactan Bridge and locally as the Second Bridge, is an extradosed cable-stayed bridge located in Metro Cebu in the Philippines. It crosses the Mactan Channel, connecting Mandaue in mainland Cebu to Lapu-Lapu City in Mactan Island. It is currently the second-longest cable-stayed bridge in the Philippines after the Cebu–Cordova Link Expressway, which also crosses the Mactan Channel. Before it was named the Marcelo Fernan Bridge, it was called the Consolacion Bridge, owing to its proximity to the municipality of Consolacion, which is 1.6 miles (2.6 km) from its north end. It is one of three bridges crossing the Mactan Channel, the others being the Sergio Osmeña Jr. Bridge (opened in 1973) and the Cebu–Cordova Link Expressway (opened in 2022).

== History ==
In August 1993, the loan agreement was signed between Japan and the Philippines for the construction of the bridge. Package I consists the construction of the main cable-stayed bridge, which extended from 185 meters to 112.5 meters to accommodate 4-lane traffic, while Package II consists of approach viaduct and road component. The groundbreaking of the bridge was attended by President Fidel V. Ramos on October 18, 1996. Katahira & Engineers International, DCCD, Schema Consult Inc., and Sir William Halcrow & Partners Ltd. have engaged in consultancy and worked on the design of the bridge. Engineering services were completed at that time.

Kajima Corporation and Sumitomo Construction were the contractors for the construction of the bridge.

To decongest the traffic from the older Sergio Osmeña Jr. Bridge, which opened in 1973. The bridge has a total length of 1,237 meters (4,058 ft) with a centre span of 185 meters (607 ft) and was inaugurated by Ramos' successor Joseph Estrada on August 3, 1999 as the Second Mactan–Mandaue Bridge. After its completion, the bridge had one of the widest and longest bridge spans in the Philippines. The bridge was constructed with the help of the Japanese government.

On June 27, 2000, the bridge was renamed as the Marcelo Fernan Bridge through Republic Act 8795, after former Chief Justice and Senate President Marcelo Fernan, who died a month before the bridge's opening.

== Additional information ==
On the Mactan Island side of the bridge, there is a park called the Millennium Park at the base of the bridge's piers, and the Filipino Seafarers Memorial is located in that park. Also, the bridge has two pedestrian walkways, one each on the north and south sides. On the Cebu Island side of the bridge, there is Mandaue, where the bridge can be accessed via United Nations Avenue. The Mactan side of the bridge, which is in Lapu-Lapu City, can be accessed via Old Patiller Road, a spur road of the Manuel L. Quezon National Highway.

The bridge also sits astride the northern end of the Mactan Channel, a gateway to the Cebu International Port managed by the Cebu Port Authority, where about 80% of domestic and international shipping operators and shipbuilders in the Philippines are located. The Sergio Osmeña Bridge is about 1.6 km (0.99 mi) south of the Marcelo Fernan Bridge.

== See also ==
- Extradosed bridge
- Cable-stayed bridge
