= Sumitomo Mitsui Construction =

Japanese construction company

Sumitomo Mitsui Construction Co., Ltd.
- Native name: 三井住友建設株式会社
- Type: Public (Kabushiki gaisha)
- Traded as: TYO: 1821
- ISIN: JP3889200006
- Industry: Construction
- Predecessor: Mitsui Kensetsu; Sumitomo Kensetsu
- Founded: 2003; 23 years ago through merger
- Headquarters: Chuo-ku, Tokyo 104-0051, Japan
- Area served: Worldwide
- Key people: Yoshiyuki Norihisa (Chairman of the Board and CEO); Hideo Arai (President and COO)
- Services: Civil engineering; Construction; Elderly care facility management
- Revenue: ▼JPY 403.9 billion (FY 2016) (US$ 3.7 billion) (FY 2016)
- Net income: ▲JPY 17 billion (FY 2016) (US$ 157 million) (FY 2016)
- Number of employees: 4,444 (as of March 31, 2016)
- Website: Official website

The Sumitomo Mitsui Construction Company, Ltd. (三井住友建設株式会社, Sumitomo Mitsui Kensetsu kabushiki gaisha; SMCC) is a Japanese general construction company based in the Chuo ward of Tokyo. The company traces it routes back to 1887, when Nishimoto-Gumi, the predecessor of Mitsui Construction, was established. This company was incorporated in 1941. The current company was formed in 2003 when Mitsui Construction and Sumitomo Construction agreed to merge. The company is part of the Mitsui Group and Sumitomo Group.
