= Cebu–Cordova Link Expressway =

Longest bridge in the Philippines, connecting Cebu City and Cordova, Cebu

- The bridge in January 2026
- Coordinates: 10°16′54.044″N 123°54′15.624″E
- Crosses: Mactan Channel
- Locale: Metro Cebu
- Other name(s): Cebu–Cordova Bridge; Third Cebu–Mactan Bridge; Third Bridge
- Owner: Cebu–Cordova Link Expressway Corporation
- Maintained by: Cebu–Cordova Link Expressway Corporation
- Website: cclex.com.ph
- Preceded by: Mactan–Mandaue Bridge

Characteristics
- Design: Cable-stayed bridge
- Total length: 8.9 km (5.5 mi)
- Width: 27 m (89 ft)
- Height: 145 m (476 ft)
- Traversable?: Yes
- Longest span: 390 m (1,280 ft)
- Clearance below: 51 m (167 ft)
- No. of lanes: 4

History
- Architect: Dissing+Weitling Architecture (conceptual design)
- Designer: SENER Ingenieria y Sistemas & Carlos Fernandez Casado (SENER–CFC JV)
- Engineering design by: SENER Ingenieria y Sistemas & Carlos Fernandez Casado (SENER–CFC JV)
- Constructed by: Cebu Link Joint Venture (Acciona–First Balfour–DMCI JV)
- Construction cost: ₱33 billion
- Opened: April 30, 2022; 4 years ago
- Inaugurated: April 27, 2022; 4 years ago

Statistics
- Daily traffic: at least 40,000 (projected)
- Toll: See toll

Location
- Interactive map of Cebu–Cordova Link Expressway

The Cebu–Cordova Link Expressway (CCLEX), also known as the Cebu–Cordova Bridge and the Third Cebu–Mactan Bridge, is an 8.9-kilometer (5.5 mi) toll bridge expressway in Metro Cebu, Philippines. The bridge connects the South Road Properties in Cebu City on mainland Cebu with Cordova on the island of Mactan. Crossing the Mactan Channel, the bridge is the third road link between the islands of Cebu and Mactan and the first between Cebu City and Cordova. It is the longest sea-crossing bridge in the Philippines, surpassing the 2-kilometer (1.2 mi) San Juanico Bridge between Samar and Leyte, as well as the Marcelo Fernan Bridge (which also crosses the Mactan Channel) as the longest cable-stayed bridge in the Philippines. It also surpassed the 5-kilometer (3.1 mi) Candaba Viaduct of the North Luzon Expressway (NLEX), connecting the provinces of Pampanga and Bulacan, as the longest bridge in the Philippines upon its completion on October 5, 2021.

== History ==
=== Planning ===
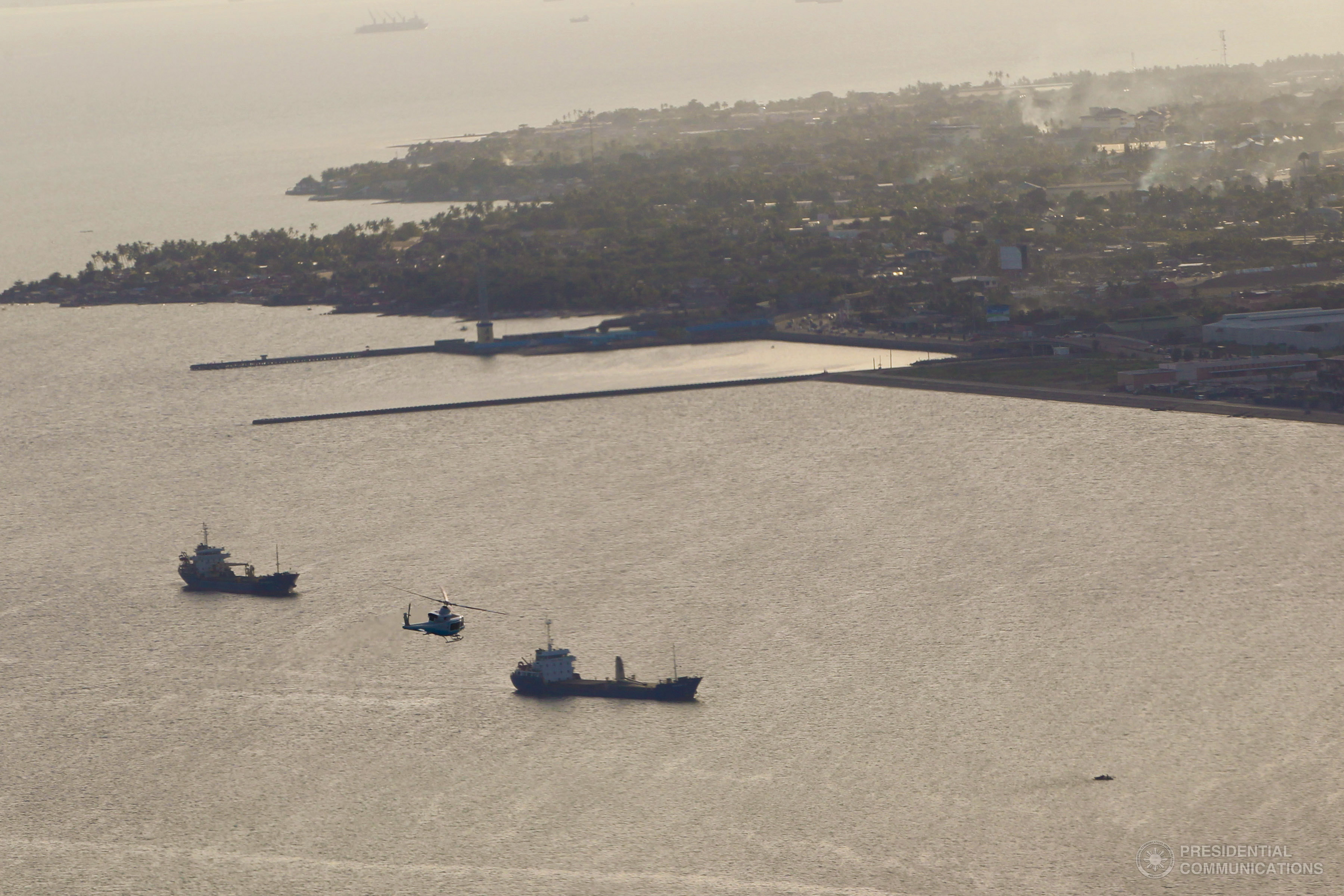
Site before the Cebu-Cordova Link Expressway was built

The bridge was first proposed by Cordova mayor Adelino Sitoy to connect his municipality with mainland Cebu in Cebu City. In 2014, an unsolicited proposal was put forth by Metro Pacific Tollways Corporation (MPTC) to build a bridge linking Cebu City and Cordova, which was then under review by a joint venture selection committee between the two local government units. After numerous studies were conducted, the local governments of Cordova and Cebu City entered into a public–private partnership with Metro Pacific Tollways Development Corp. (MPTDC). The construction of the Cebu–Cordova bridge was lobbied by then chairman of the Regional Development Council of Region VII, Mike Rama, who became Mayor of Cebu City when the Cebu–Cordova Bridge project was already awarded to a company.

In January 2016, Cebu Cordova Link Expressway Corporation (CCLEC) signed an agreement on February 7 for a ₱19-billion loan and security bonds with six banks: Development Bank of the Philippines (DBP), Rizal Commercial Banking Corporation (RCBC), Bank of the Philippine Islands (BPI), Robinsons Bank, UnionBank, and Security Bank. CCLEC is a subsidiary of Metro Pacific Tollways Development Corp. (MPTDC), which will fund the rest of the project through disclosure to the Philippine Stock Exchange and by equity or supplemental capital loans from other private and interested parties who want to invest in the project and become stockholders of the said bridge.

MPTDC announced that the construction of the bridge was to commence in 2017. The company, in the same announcement, said that it would be responsible for the construction and financing of the bridge, as well as its operation once completed.

=== Construction and opening ===
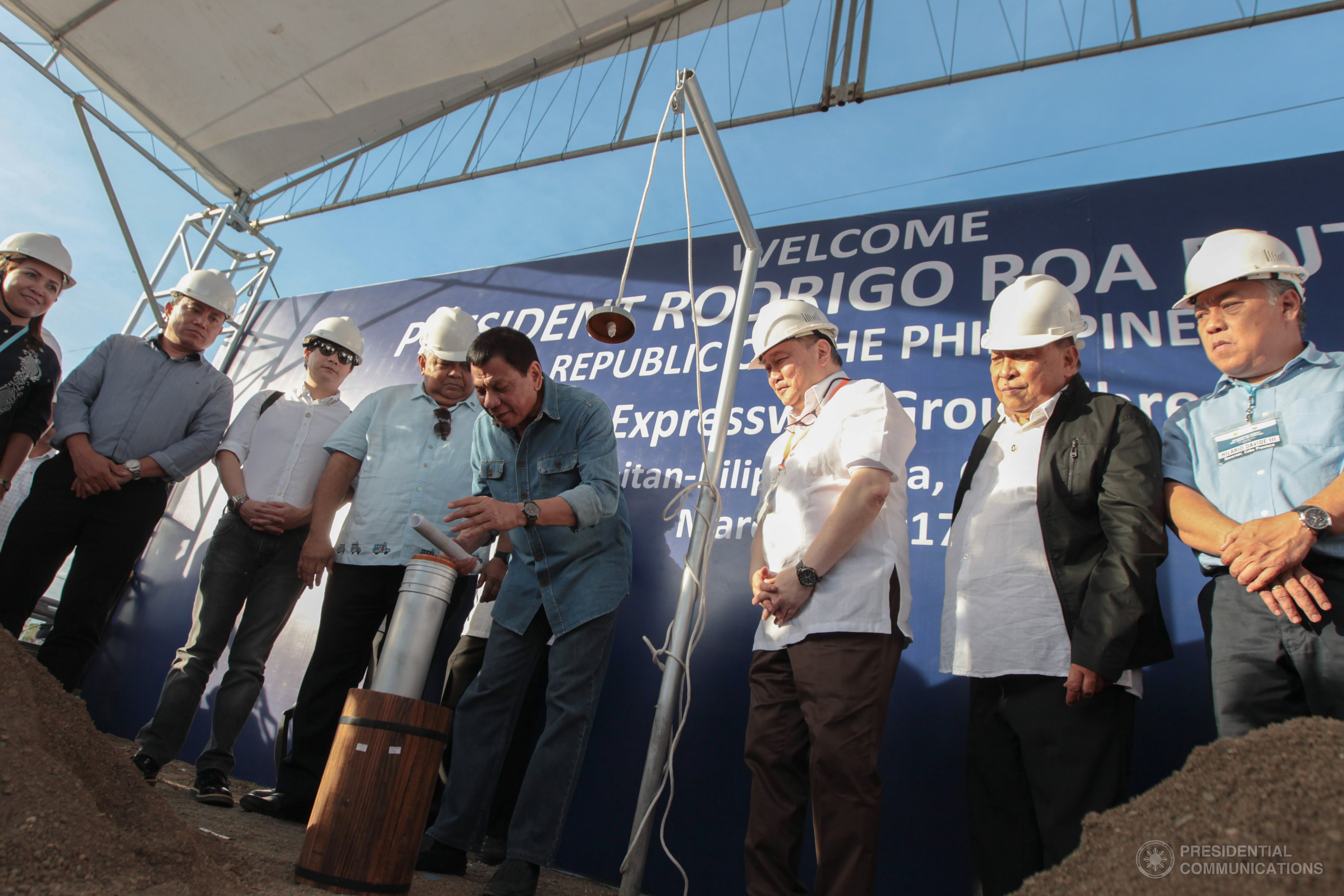
President Rodrigo Duterte (center) led the burying of the time capsule during the groundbreaking ceremony of the CCLEX at the Virlo Public Market in Cebu on March 2, 2017

The groundbreaking ceremony for the Cebu–Cordova Bridge was held on March 2, 2017. The expressway was MPTDC's first venture outside of Luzon.

In 2021, the bridge played a role in the Quincentennial Commemorations in the Philippines, as eight ecumenical "Iconic Crosses" were placed near the tops of the two main pylons. The crosses were lighted on April 15, 2021.

The final concrete pouring in the main bridge deck was held on October 5, 2021, effectively completing the main bridge deck.

The bridge was inaugurated by President Rodrigo Duterte on April 27, 2022, coinciding with the 501st anniversary of the Battle of Mactan. It is the first expressway and toll road in the Philippines outside of Luzon. It was formally opened to motorists three days later on April 30, 2022.

== Operation ==
CCLEX is managed by Cebu–Cordova Link Expressway Corporation (CCLEC), a subsidiary of Metro Pacific Tollways Corporation (MPTC), a company of MVP Group of Companies.

== Design ==
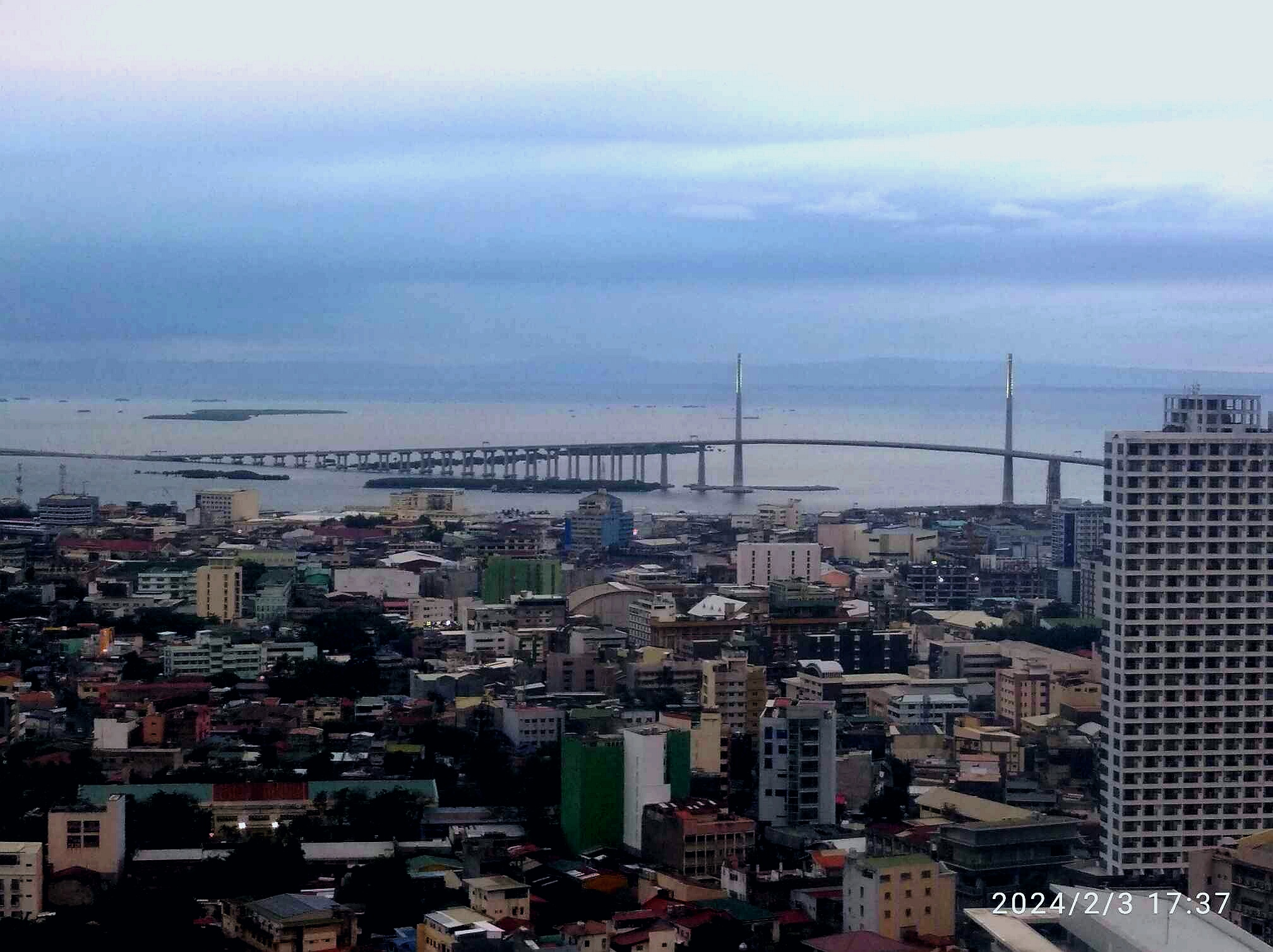
CCLEX (Cebu-Cordova Link Expressway), photographed from inside a high-rise building in Cebu City

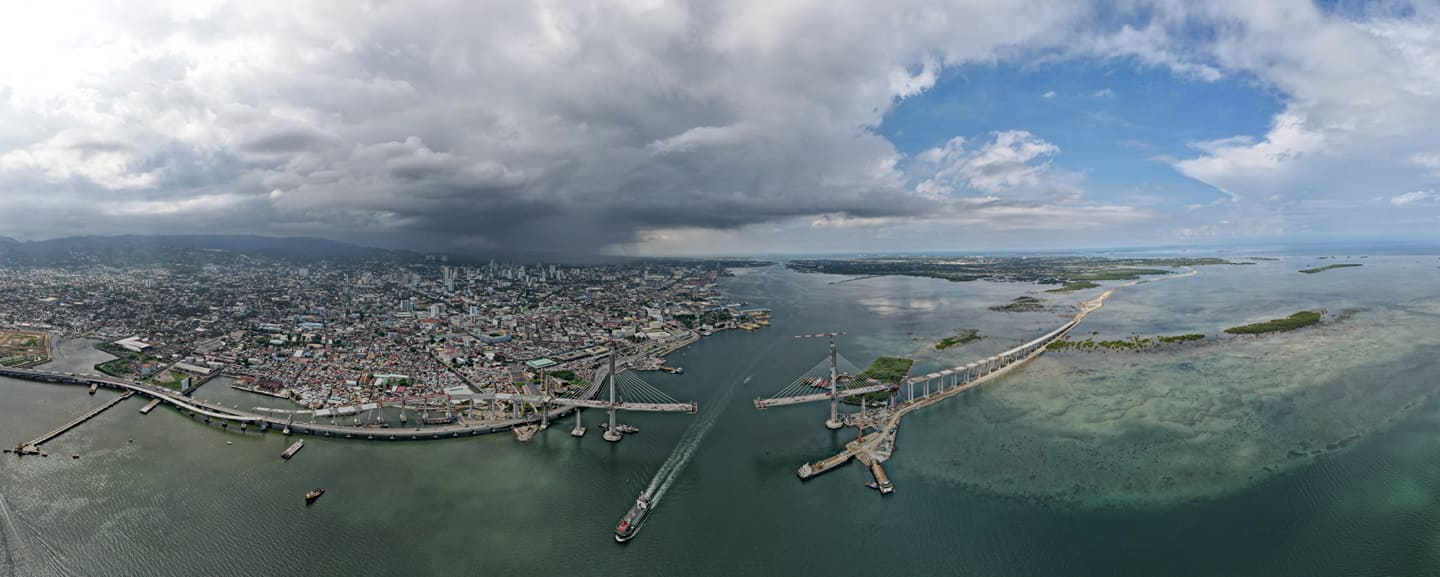
Photo of the bridge under construction in March 2021

The bridge spans 8.9 kilometers (5.5 mi) and is the longest and tallest in the Philippines, surpassing the San Juanico Bridge, which crosses Leyte and Samar, and the Candaba Viaduct along the North Luzon Expressway. It was designed by the Spanish firms Carlos Fernandez Casado (CFC) and SENER Ingeniería y Sistemas, while the local firm DCCD Engineering Corporation and the Danish firm COWI are the owner's engineers. The Spanish firm FHECOR was responsible for the Independent Checking Engineering. The bridge was built through a joint venture between Spanish firm Acciona and Philippine firms First Balfour and DMCI. Connecting Cebu City and Cordova, the 27-meter-wide (89 ft) bridge is meant to serve an alternate route serving Mactan–Cebu International Airport, capable of serving at least 40,000 vehicles daily.

The 390-meter-long (1,280 ft) main span of the CCLEX is cable-stayed and is supported by 145-meter-high (476 ft) twin tower pylons. The design of the pylons was inspired by the historic Magellan's Cross Pavilion. The main span will have a 51-meter (167 ft) navigation clearance, which allows ships to traverse the bridge. Viaduct approach bridges and a causeway will also form part of the CCLEX, as well as toll road facilities on an artificial island. The toll facilities' design is inspired by the eight-rayed sun of the Philippine flag.

== Toll ==
CCLEX toll booth

The bridge expressway uses a barrier toll system, where motorists pay a fixed toll rate based on vehicle class. The toll plaza is located on an artificial island after the main bridge, serving as the only toll collection point of the expressway. Since its opening, cash has been used for toll collection. An electronic toll collection (ETC) system was implemented on July 2, 2022.

The toll rates are as follows:

Class	Amount
Class 1M (Motorcycles with engine displacement from 110cc–399cc)	₱68.00
Class 1 (Cars, motorcycles 400cc and above, SUVs, jeepneys)	₱107.00
Class 1 above 7 feet (2.1 meters) (vehicles with recreational equipment)	₱214.00
Class 2 (Buses, light trucks)	₱214.00
Class 3 (Heavy trucks and trailers)	₱321.00
Pedestrians and Bicycles	₱0

== Extension ==
As of 2024, the CCLEX is traversed by 17,000 vehicles, lower than its 60,000 traffic capacity. There are proposals to extend the expressway to increase vehicular traffic through the bridge. On the Cebu City side of the bridge, there is a proposal for an approximately 2 km (1.2 mi) long ramp that would straddle along the Guadalupe River. If completed, the expansion will cost an estimated ₱1 billion and provide a direct connection from Cebu City's central business districts to the CCLEX. The groundbreaking of the ramp was held on November 8, 2022, and works are set to start by 2024. On September 24, 2025, a ₱70 million weighbridge funded by the CCLEC was opened along the Cebu South Coastal Road (CSCR) to curb overloaded trucks passing through the viaduct. A similar weighbridge was also constructed on the Cordova side of CCLEX.

On the Mactan side, the expressway terminates near the barangays of Pilipog and Ibabao (both in Cordova), intersecting the Babag II Road of Barangay Babag (in Lapu-Lapu City). From here, an extension is proposed through Lapu-Lapu City and a possible direct connection to Mactan–Cebu International Airport. The planned extension will add 5 to 8 kilometers (3.1 to 5.0 mi) to the expressway and is estimated to cost ₱10 billion to ₱15 billion.

CCLEX is also eyed to be connected to the proposed Cebu–Bohol Bridge.
