= Mactan–Mandaue Bridge =

Bridge in Metro Cebu, Philippines

Mactan–Mandaue Bridge (a.k.a. Sergio Osmeña Jr. Bridge)
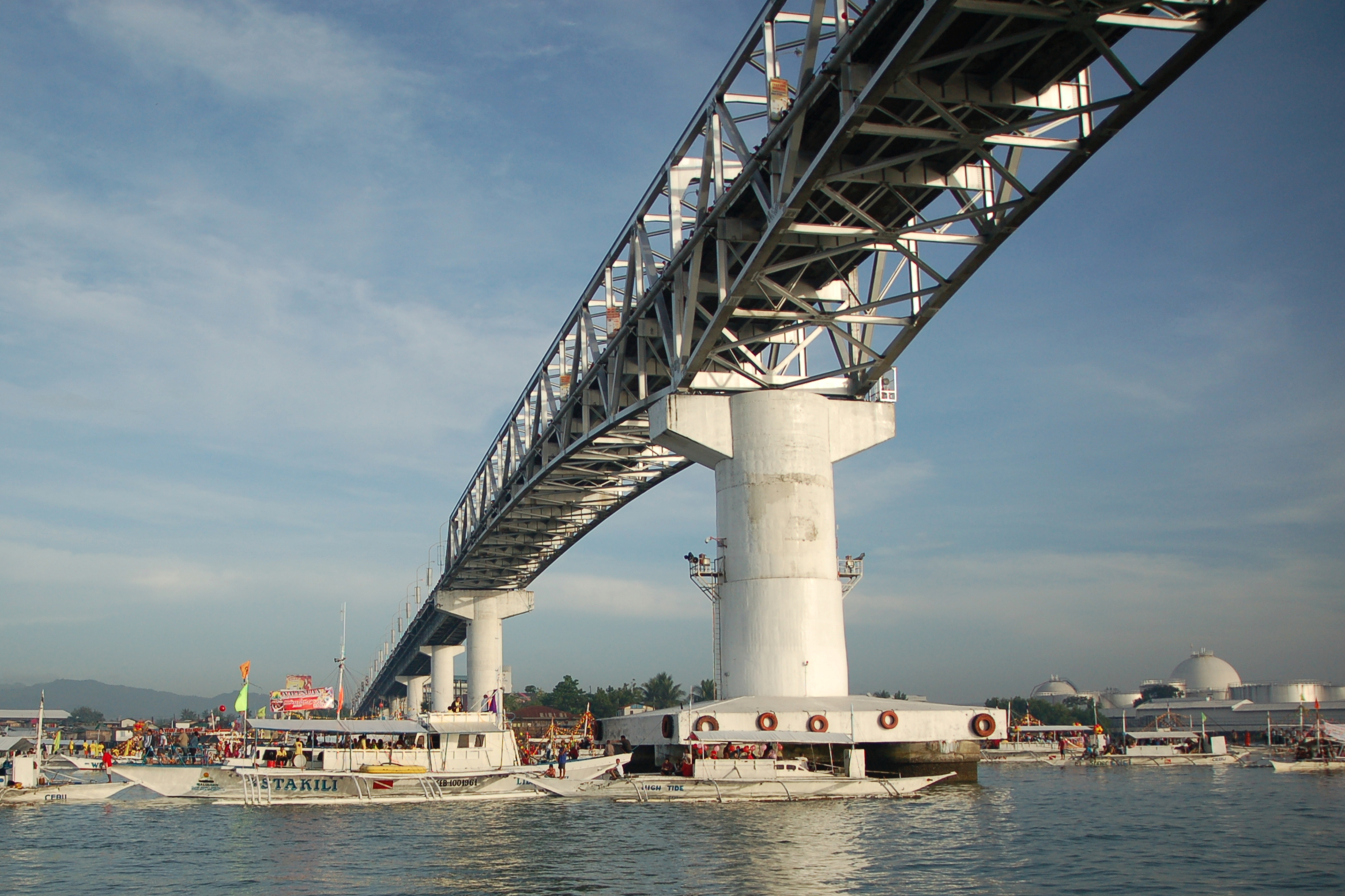
- As seen from Mactan
- Coordinates: 10°19′11.4″N 123°57′20.3″E
- Carries: 2 lanes of N82 (Mandaue–Mactan Road); pedestrian sidewalks
- Crosses: Mactan Channel
- Locale: Metro Cebu
- Maintained by: Department of Public Works and Highways
- Followed by: Marcelo Fernan Bridge

Characteristics
- Design: Truss bridge
- Total length: 854 m (2,802 ft)
- Width: 9 m (30 ft)
- Longest span: 145 m (476 ft)

History
- Designer: Ronald C. Cosep and Associates
- Construction start: 1970
- Inaugurated: July 4, 1973

Location
- Interactive map of Mactan–Mandaue Bridge (a.k.a. Sergio Osmeña Jr. Bridge)

The (First) Mactan–Mandaue Bridge, officially known as the Serging Veloso Osmeña Jr. Bridge also known as the First Cebu–Mactan Bridge and First Bridge locally, is a truss bridge that crosses the Mactan Channel and connects the cities of Mandaue and Lapu-Lapu City in Metro Cebu, Philippines. It is one of three bridges that span across the Mactan Channel, the other being the Marcelo Fernan Bridge and the Cebu–Cordova Link Expressway, and connects the islands of Cebu and Mactan.

== History ==
On September 19, 1968, Cebu Governor Rene G. Espina, then Acting Secretary of Public Works, Transportation and Communications, met with Danao Mayor Beatriz Durano, Samboan Mayor Beatriz Calderon, Mandaue Mayor Demetrio Cortez, and S.C. Shangkuan, the bridge's contractor in Malacañang Palace to discuss with then-President Ferdinand Marcos, about the construction of the bridge. Construction began in 1970, a year after the ordination of Mandaue as a chartered city. It was inaugurated on July 4, 1973. The bridge is popularly claimed to be designed and created by Kajima Corporation.

In April 2013, the Mactan–Cebu Bridge Management Board renamed the bridge to "Sergio Osmeña Jr. Bridge" in honor of the former senator and Cebu Governor Sergio Osmeña Jr., who was born in the nearby city of Cebu. To formally recognize the renaming of the bridge, on January 22, 2020, then Cebu City Representative Raul del Mar filed House Bill No. 05997 and has passed Congressional approval.

The bill naming the first bridge as the Serging Veloso Osmeña Bridge, lapsed into law, as Republic Act No. 11828 on June 2, 2022, after then-President Rodrigo Duterte was not able to sign the bill within 30 days.

== Description ==
This bridge sits astride the northern end of the Mactan Channel, which is a gateway to the Cebu International Port which is managed by the Cebu Port Authority, where about 80% of domestic and international shipping operators and shipbuilders in the Philippines are located. The Marcelo Fernan Bridge is located about 1.6 kilometers (0.99 mi) north of the bridge.

The bridge has only one pedestrian walkway, on the south side of the bridge. From Mandaue on mainland Cebu, the bridge is accessed via A. C. Cortes Avenue. Lapu-Lapu City on Mactan is accessed via the Basak–Marigondon Road, which intersects with the Manuel L. Quezon National Highway. It connects Barangay Pajo of Lapu-Lapu City and Mandaue City.
