= Port of Cebu =

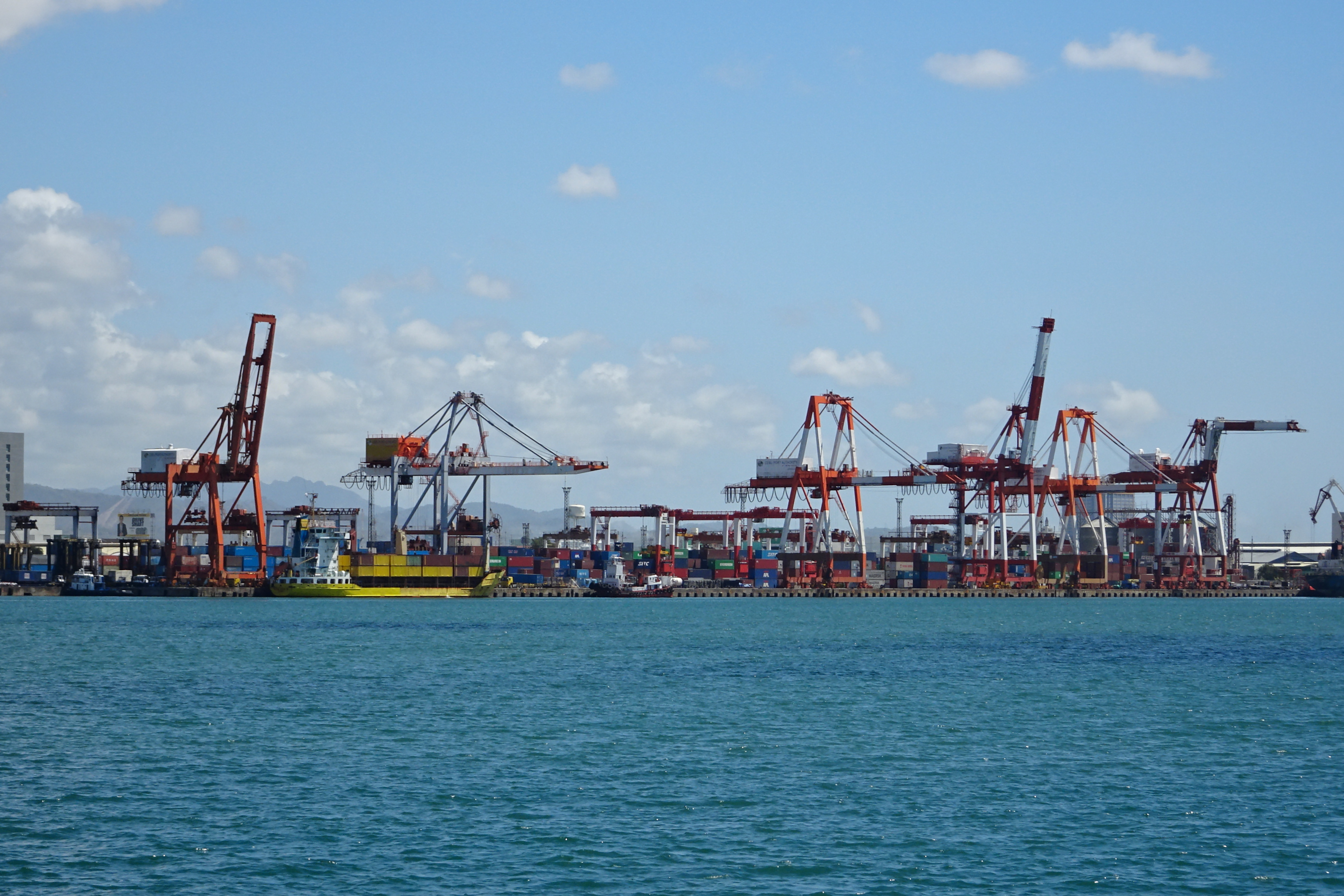
- Interactive map of Port of Cebu

Location
- Country: Philippines
- Location: Cebu City, Philippines
- Coordinates: 10°18′23″N 123°55′34″E
- UN/LOCODE: PHCEB

Details
- Operated by: Cebu Port Authority
- Type of Harbor: Artificial
- Size: medium

Statistics
- Annual cargo tonnage: 9,596,102^{(2011)}
- Annual container volume: 181,419^{(2011)}
- Passenger traffic: 15,636,198^{(2011)}
- Website www.cpa.gov.ph

Cebu Port Authority
- Paggamhanan sa Pantalan sa Sugbo

Agency overview
- Formed: 1992
- Superseding agency: Seaports of the Philippines
- Jurisdiction: Metro Cebu and Province
- Headquarters: CPA Executive Building, S. Osmeña Jr. Blvd., North Reclamation Area, Cebu City, Cebu, Philippines
- Agency executive: Francisco C. Comendador III, General Manager
- Parent agency: Department of Transportation
- Website: www.cpa.gov.ph

Port of Cebu (Cebuano: Pantalan sa Sugbo) is a seaport located in Cebu City, Philippines. It serves the Metro Cebu Area and is managed by the Cebu Port Authority. It is the largest domestic port in the Philippines, mostly serving routes in the Visayas and Mindanao.

== Location ==
The port is located in the North Reclamation Area, Cebu City. It is in the Mactan Channel, a narrow strait between Cebu and Mactan Island.

== Facilities ==
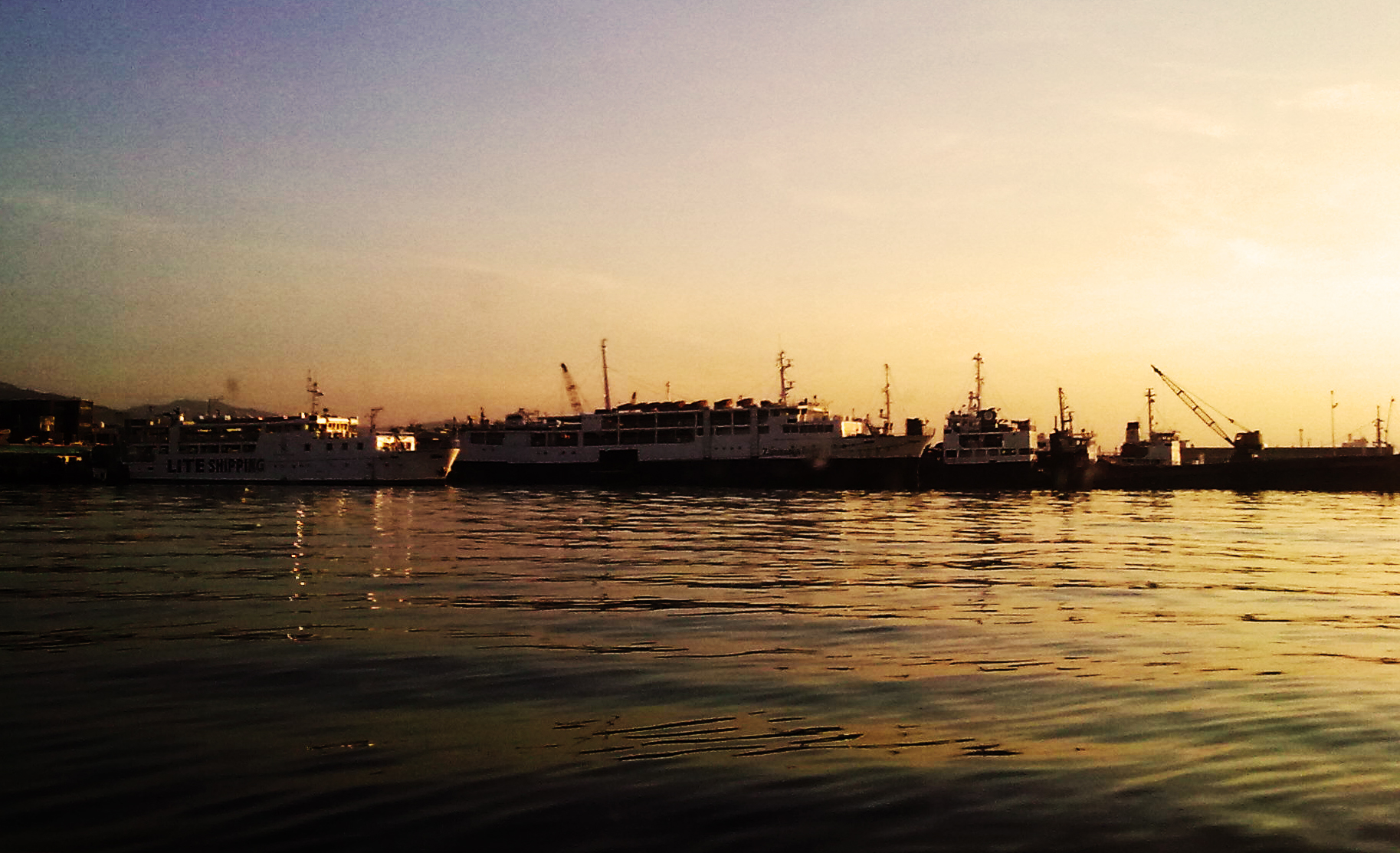
Twilight at Cebu City Pier 1 harbor

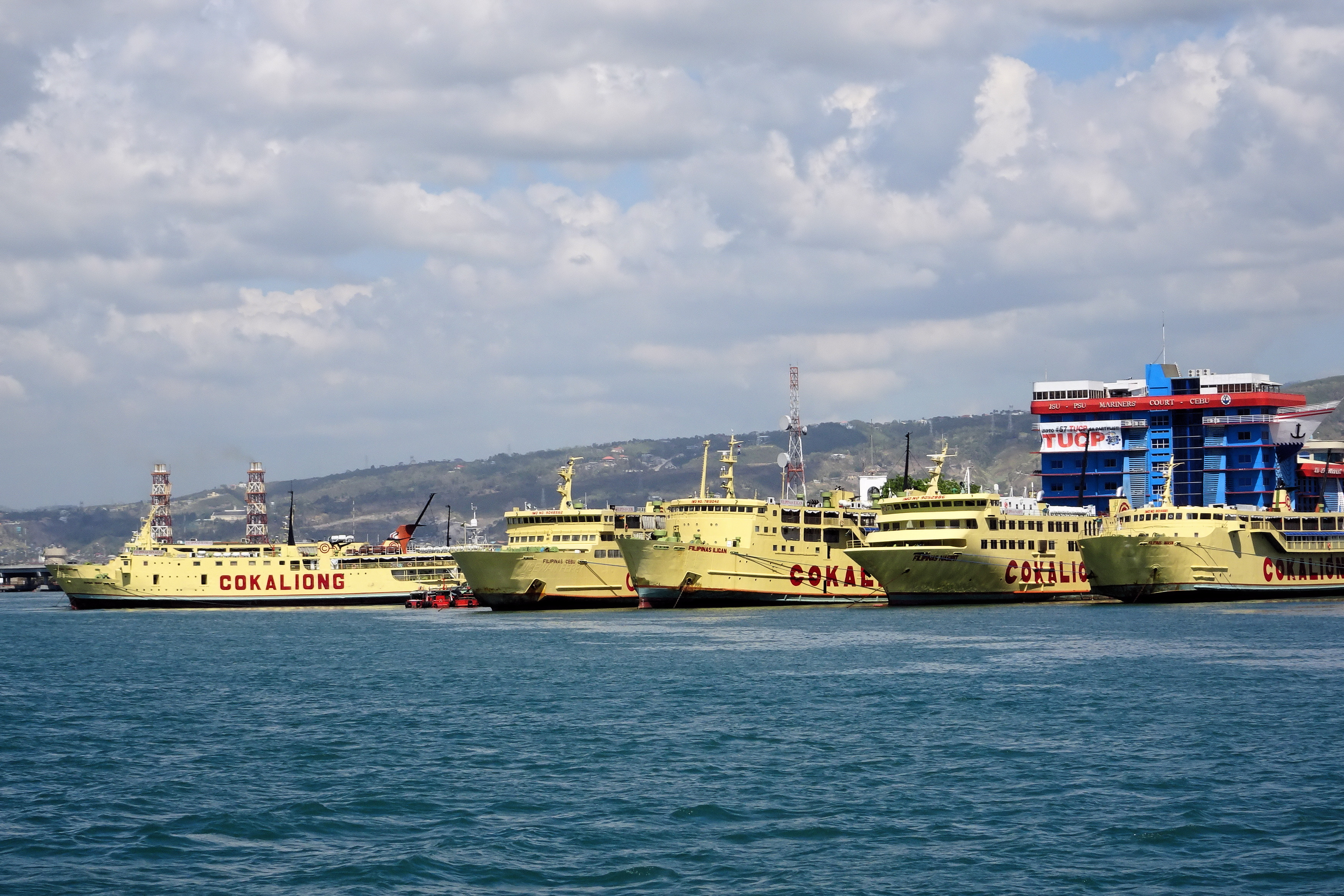
Port harbor with Cokaliong Shipping Lines ferries

Passenger terminal in 2022

The harbor consists of international and domestic sections.

The Cebu International Port covers an area of 14 hectares (35 acres), consisting of 512 metres (1,680 ft) of berthing space, with 1,953 TEU ground slots and 204 refrigerated container plugs, as well as a bulk handling terminal.

The Cebu Domestic Port covers an area of 21 hectares (52 acres), consisting of 3,838.47 metres (12,593.4 ft) of berthing space and three piers, three passenger terminals for inter-island trips, and two ferry terminals for Cebu City–Mactan ferry boats.

=== Passenger terminal ===
The 2,688 square metres (28,930 sq ft) terminal started regular operations on November 21, 2014. It features a terminal with a lobby, a send-off area, and a last-minute canteen.

== Statistics ==
Statistics include all ports under jurisdiction by Cebu Port Authority, i.e. Cebu City, Mandaue, Danao, Santa Fe, Toledo, and Argao.

Year	Ship calls		Container traffic		Cargo traffic		Passenger traffic
	Domestic	Foreign	Domestic	Foreign	Domestic	Foreign	
2008	68,959	757	226,133	157,634	16,043,164	5,425,518	13,636,584
2009	70,161	801	310,843	178,878	15,542,547	5,766,733	13,064,604
2010	73,863	956	290,046	204,193	17,712,958	6,344,719	14,959,225
2011	73,491	911	330,113	208,087	18,169,470	7,195,672	15,636,198
2012	99,176	970	386,363	234,188	15,778,365	5,083,038	16,205,614
2013	111,140	946	390,923	240,292	16,837,854	5,523,470	17,087,848
2014	107,931	1,001	423,264	285,049	20,017,463	6,141,957	16,312,425
2015	111,279	1,076	462,581	366,565	25,815,173	6,385,893	18,206,216
2016	113,540	780	388,410	341,713	33,150,000	11,350,000	17,840,000
