= Mactan Channel =

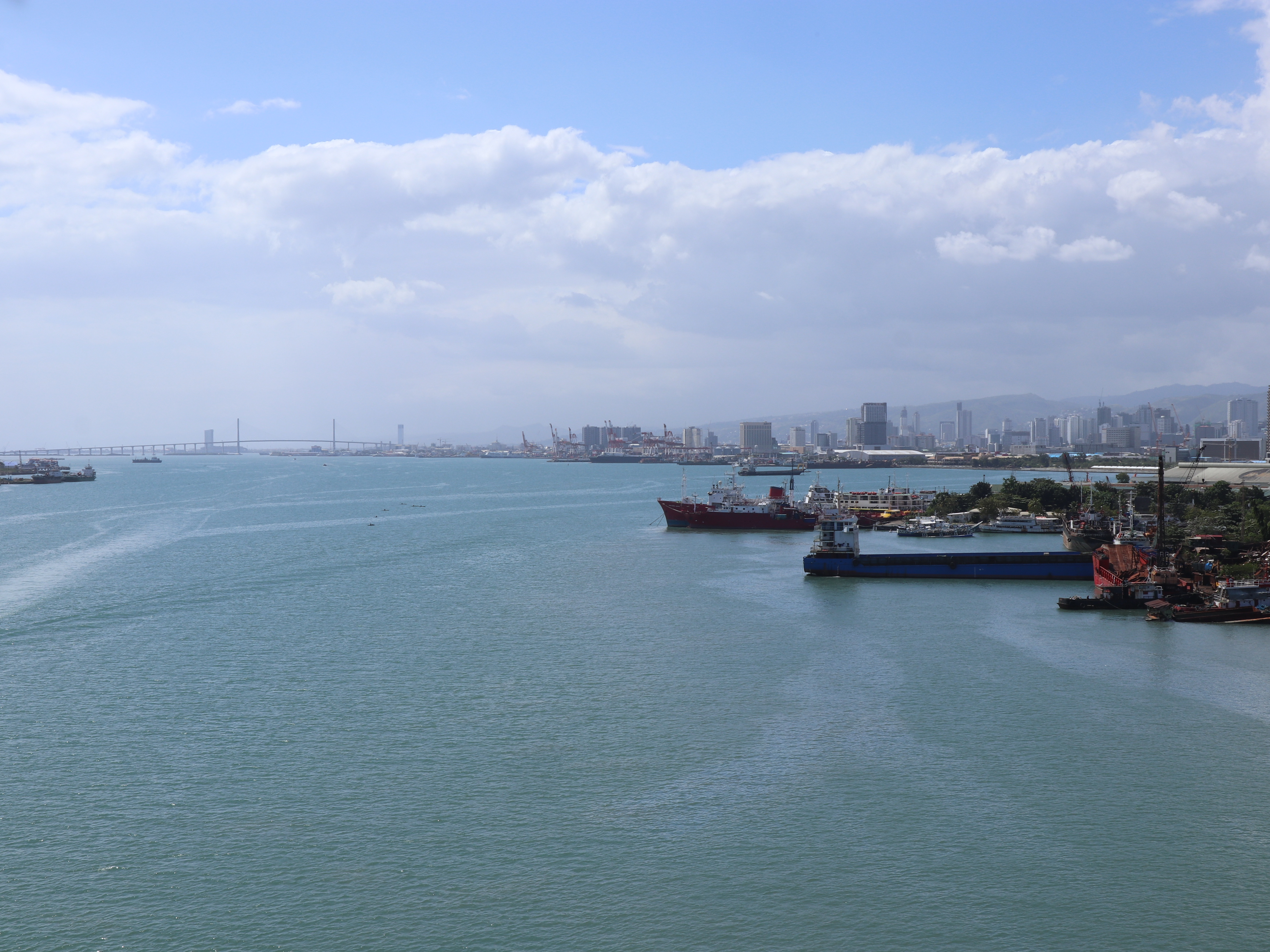
- The channel in Mandaue City

- Location within the Philippines Mactan Channel (Philippines)
- Location: Central Visayas, Philippines
- Coordinates: 10°18′45″N 123°56′22″E
- Type: Channel

The Mactan Channel, also known as Opon Channel, is a channel in Cebu, Philippines. It runs between mainland Cebu island and the smaller island of Mactan. The body of water is located within Metro Cebu, separating the localities of Mandaue and Cebu City in mainland Cebu and Lapu-Lapu City on Mactan. It is one of the three channels that connect the Cebu Strait to the Camotes Sea — the other two being the Hilutangan Channel and the Olango Channel.

== Overview ==
Mactan Channel is an important passageway for ships docking on the Port of Cebu. Ferries from Cebu bound for other islands, such as Samar, Leyte, Bohol, Negros, Mindanao, and also for the ports of Manila, Cagayan de Oro, and Butuan operate from the Port of Cebu and extensively use this channel. Various ferry companies operate out of this channel, some of which include: Weesam Express (SRN Fast Seacrafts, Inc.), 2GO Travel, OceanJet, Cokaliong Shipping Lines, & Trans-Asia Shipping Lines. There are also various other small local ferry lines (Catamaran) that operate and go to the various small islands of the Camotes Sea as well.

== Infrastructure ==
The Port of Cebu is located along the shores of Mactan Channel, on Cebu City. Mactan–Cebu International Airport is on the north side of Mactan, near the north end of the channel. There are three bridges that cross the channel: the Sergio Osmeña Bridge and the Marcelo Fernan Bridge, both of which connect Mandaue on the Cebu mainland and Lapu-Lapu City on Mactan Island. A third bridge, the Cebu–Cordova Link Expressway (CCLEX), connects Cordova in Mactan Island to Cebu City on the Cebu mainland.

Commercial establishments have started to sprout along the shores of the channel. The South Road Properties in Cebu City is a 300 hectares (740 acres) development reclaimed from Mactan Channel. It is home to several mixed-use developments, including SM Seaside, City di Mare, and South Coast City. The North Reclamation Area of Cebu City and Mandaue, also reclaimed from the channel, is also home to several businesses and developments, including SM City Cebu, Robinsons Galleria Cebu, and Mandani Bay, among other establishments. There are also various hotels on either side of the channel, many of which command a sea view of the channel, such as Nustar Resort & Casino.

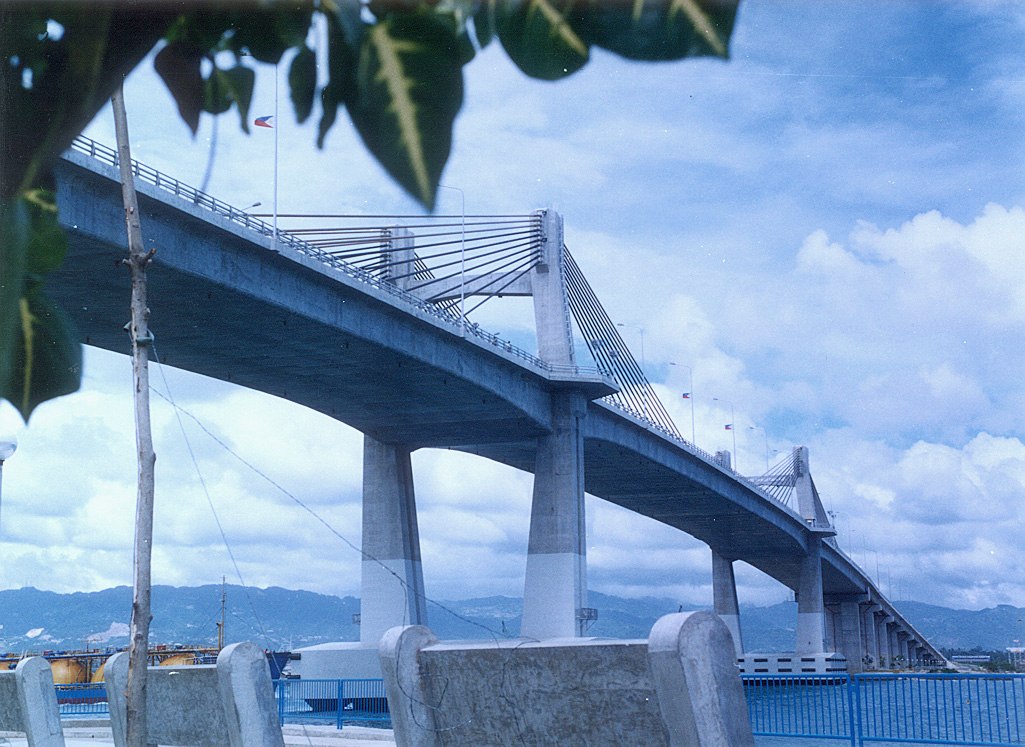
Marcelo Fernan Bridge, as seen from Mactan Island)

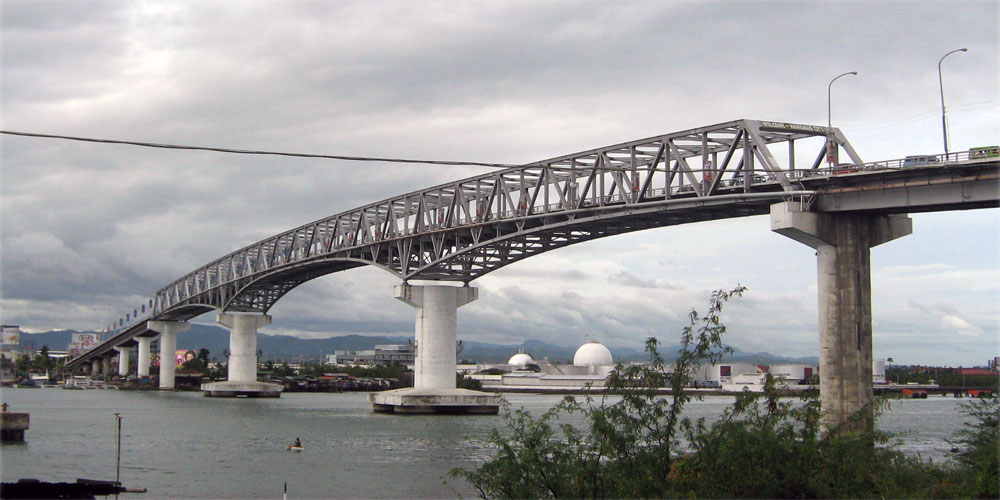
Sergio Osmeña Bridge, as seen from Mactan Island

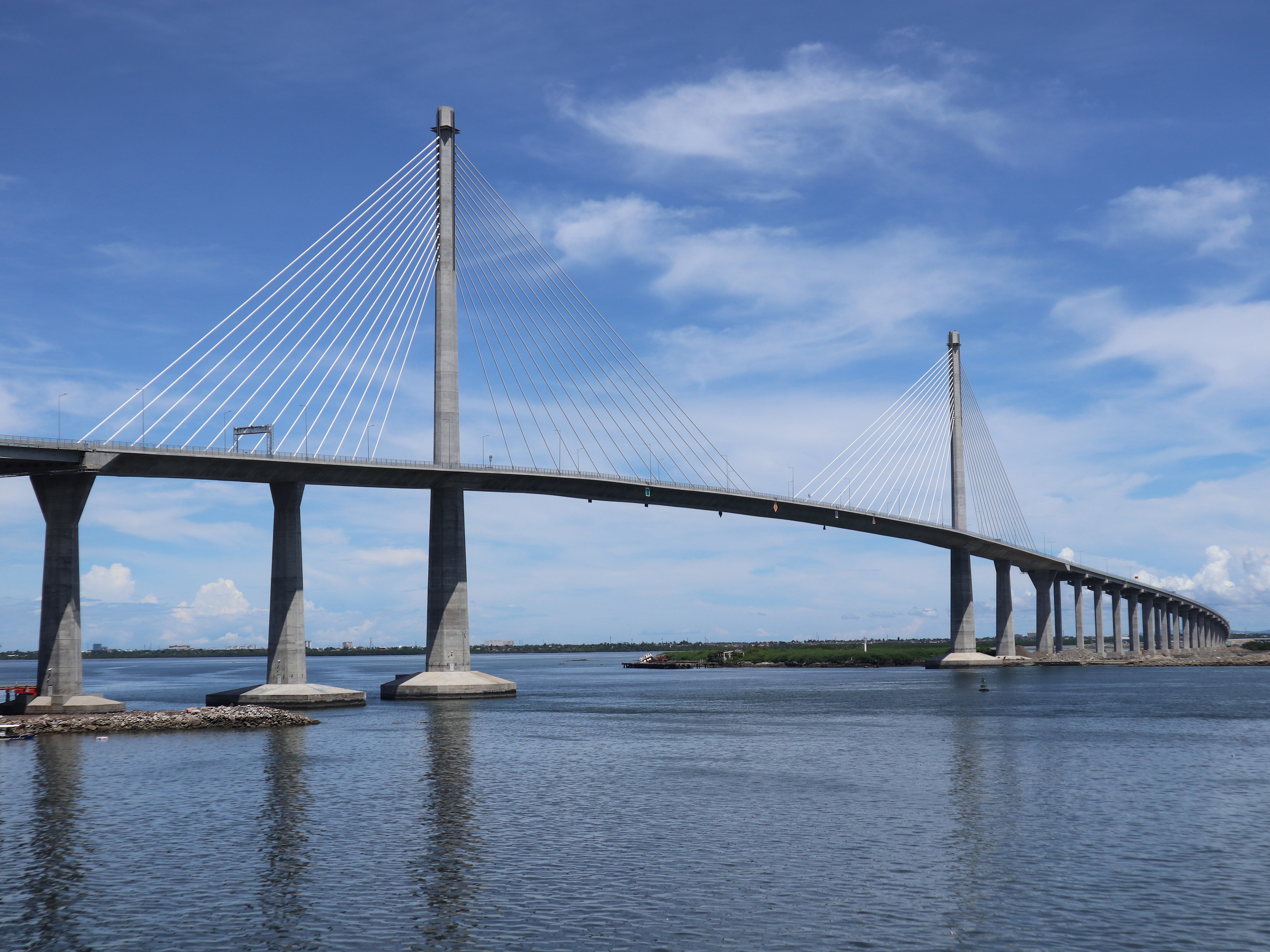
Cebu–Cordova Link Expressway, as seen from the South Road Properties

== History ==
The Port of Cebu — the second largest port in the country — is located along Mactan Channel and has been used since the Spanish Colonial Period. It was organized as a Channel in Cebu on March 1, 1958. The channel was first spanned by the Sergio Osmeña Bridge in 1971, the Marcelo Fernan Bridge in 1999, and then by the Cebu–Cordova Link Expressway in 2022.

Since the 2000s, the channel has suffered from pollution, exacerbated due to its position off of Metro Cebu, a large metropolitan area. It is claimed that the waters of Mactan Channel have "become so polluted that eating marine life caught from its waters can cause illnesses in humans and may even contribute to long-term diseases like cancer". The sources from the pollution have been identified from the various rivers in Metro Cebu which empty into the channel, as well as residents and industries along the coast dumping their wastes directly into the channel. The pollution has also caused siltation, which has caused the channel to get shallower, with studies claiming the channel, at its shallowest parts, is only 8 metres (26 feet) deep, barely enough for ships navigating the waterway which must at least also have a draft of the same depth.

== See also ==
- Cebu–Cordova Link Expressway
- Sergio Osmeña Bridge
- Marcelo Fernan Bridge
