= List of tallest buildings in Metro Cebu =

Metro Cebu is the second-largest metropolitan area in the Philippines, and hosts a large number of high-rise buildings. As a result of the economic boom that Cebu experienced in the 1990s and 2000s (known as Ceboom), many high-rise buildings have been constructed in Cebu City and its surrounding metropolitan area. Cebu Business Park (the city's central business district), Cebu I.T. Park, the urban fringes surrounding those areas, the area around Fuente Osmeña (commonly referred to as "Uptown Cebu City") and South Road Properties (a mixed-use development on reclaimed land along Cebu South Coastal Road), are the locations of most of the skyscraper developments in Metro Cebu.

The Crown Regency Hotel multi-tower complex in 2022

Horizons 101 (Tower 1), finished in 2015, is the tallest building in Metro Cebu the tallest in the Philippines outside Metro Manila.

== Tallest completed buildings above 100 meters tall ==
This list ranks the high rise buildings in Metro Cebu that stand at least 100 metres (328 ft) tall, based on standard height measurement. This may include spires and architectural details but does not include antenna masts.

Rank	Name	Height (m)	Storeys	Year completed	Location		Notes
Rank	Name	Height (m)	Storeys	Year completed	City	Location within the city	Notes
1	Horizons 101 Tower 1	185 m (607 ft)	55	2017	Cebu City	General Maxilom Avenue	Tallest building in Cebu and outside Metro Manila. Also the tallest residential building in the province.
2	SM Sky Tower	170 m (560 ft)	N/A	2015	Cebu City	South Road Properties	Tallest observation tower in the Philippines. Tallest building in the South District of Cebu City.
3	Horizons 101 Tower 2	167 m (548 ft)	46	2019	Cebu City	General Maxilom Avenue	Completed in June 2019
3	Crown Regency Hotel	167 m (548 ft)	38	2005	Cebu City	Osmeña Boulevard	Tallest building in Metro Cebu from 2005 to 2015. Part of the Crown Regency Hotel and Towers complex. Tallest building in Cebu City by pinnacle height.
4	Cebu Exchange	164 m (538 ft)	39	2022	Cebu City	Salinas Drive	The tallest office building in Cebu and the largest office building in the Philippines by floor area.
5	The Alcoves	148.4 m (487 ft)	39	2021	Cebu City	Cebu Business Park	
6	J Tower Residences	148 m (486 ft)	40	2025	Mandaue	A.S. Fortuna Street	Tallest building in Mandaue.
7	Solinea Tower 2 (Turquoise)	140.8 m (462 ft)	32	2016	Cebu City	Cebu Business Park	
8	Park Point Residences	138 m (453 ft)	38	2016	Cebu City	Cebu Business Park	
9	Mandani Bay Suites Tower 2	135.9 m (446 ft)	36	2021	Mandaue	Mandani Bay	
10	38 Park Avenue	135 m (443 ft)	40	2024	Cebu City	Cebu I.T. Park	Tallest building in Cebu IT Park.
11	Taft East Gate Sumilon Tower	131 m (430 ft)	42	2023	Cebu City	Cardinal Rosales Avenue	
12	One Montage	130 m (430 ft)	28	2021	Cebu City	Archbishop Reyes Avenue	
12	Ultima Residences, Fuente Tower 3	130 m (430 ft)	28	2011	Cebu City	Osmeña Boulevard	Part of the Crown Regency Hotel and Towers complex.
12	Ultima Prime Residences (Tower 4)	130 m (430 ft)	32	2020	Cebu City	F. Ramos Street	Part of the Crown Regency Hotel and Towers complex.
13	Cityscape Grand Tower	120 m (390 ft)	35	2024	Cebu City	Archbishop Reyes Avenue	
13	City Suites and Ultima Residences, Ramos Tower	120 m (390 ft)	33	2011	Cebu City	F. Ramos Street	
13	Grand Residences Tower 3 (Noble Cebu Hotel)	120 m (390 ft)	35	2021	Cebu City	Gov. M. Cuenco Avenue	
13	The Suites at Gorordo	120 m (390 ft)	30	2026	Cebu City	Gorordo Avenue	
14	Avida Riala Tower 1	116 m (381 ft)	32	2016	Cebu City	Cebu I.T. Park	
14	Avida Riala Tower 2	116 m (381 ft)	32	2017	Cebu City	Cebu I.T. Park	
14	Avida Riala Tower 3	116 m (381 ft)	32	2019	Cebu City	Cebu I.T. Park	
14	Avida Riala Tower 4	116 m (381 ft)	35	2023	CebuCity	Cebu I.T. Park	
14	Solinea Tower 1 (Cyan)	116 m (381 ft)	36	2016	Cebu City	Cebu Business Park	
14	Solinea Tower 3 (Lazuli)	116 m (381 ft)	32	2018	Cebu City	Cebu Business Park	
14	Nustar Resort and Casino - Nustar Hotel	116 m (381 ft)	29	2023	Cebu City	South Road Properties	
14	Nustar Resort and Casino - Fili Hotel	116 m (381 ft)	29	2022	Cebu City	South Road Properties	
15	Base Line Prestige	112 m (367 ft)	31	2021	Cebu City	Juana Osmeña Street	
16	Latitude Corporate Center	110 m (360 ft)	24	2021	Cebu City	Cebu Business Park	Tallest office building in Cebu Business Park
17	CitySoho	109 m (358 ft)	30	2015	Cebu City	B. Rodriguez Street	
17	Sunvida Tower	109 m (358 ft)	30	2020	Cebu City	North Reclamation Area	
18	Mandani Bay Suites Tower 1	108 m (354 ft)	29	2021	Mandaue	Mandani Bay	
19	Midpoint Residences Tower 1	104 m (341 ft)	28	2019	Mandaue	Banilad	One of the tallest buildings in Mandaue from 2019 to 2025. It later jointly held the title with the completion of its sister Tower 2 in 2021.
19	Midpoint Residences Tower 2	104 m (341 ft)	28	2021	Mandaue	Banilad	The other of tallest buildings in Mandaue from 2021 to 2025, jointly holding the title with its sister Tower 1, completed earlier in 2019.
20	Calyx Centre	102 m (335 ft)	28	2013	Cebu City	Cebu I.T. Park	
21	Marco Polo Two Residences	101 m (331 ft)	29	2015	Cebu City	Lahug	
22	Marco Polo Parkview	101 m (331 ft)	28	2017	Cebu City	Lahug	
23	Calyx Residences	100 m (330 ft)	28	2011	Cebu City	Cebu Business Park	
23	Lexmark Plaza 1	100 m (330 ft)	23	2009	Cebu City	Cebu Business Park	

== Skyline ==
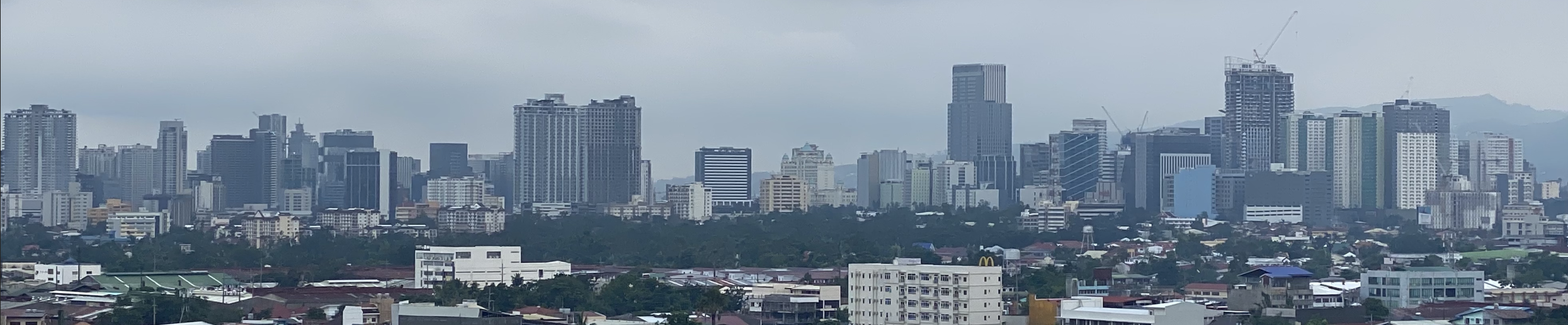
Cebu City skyline in 2022

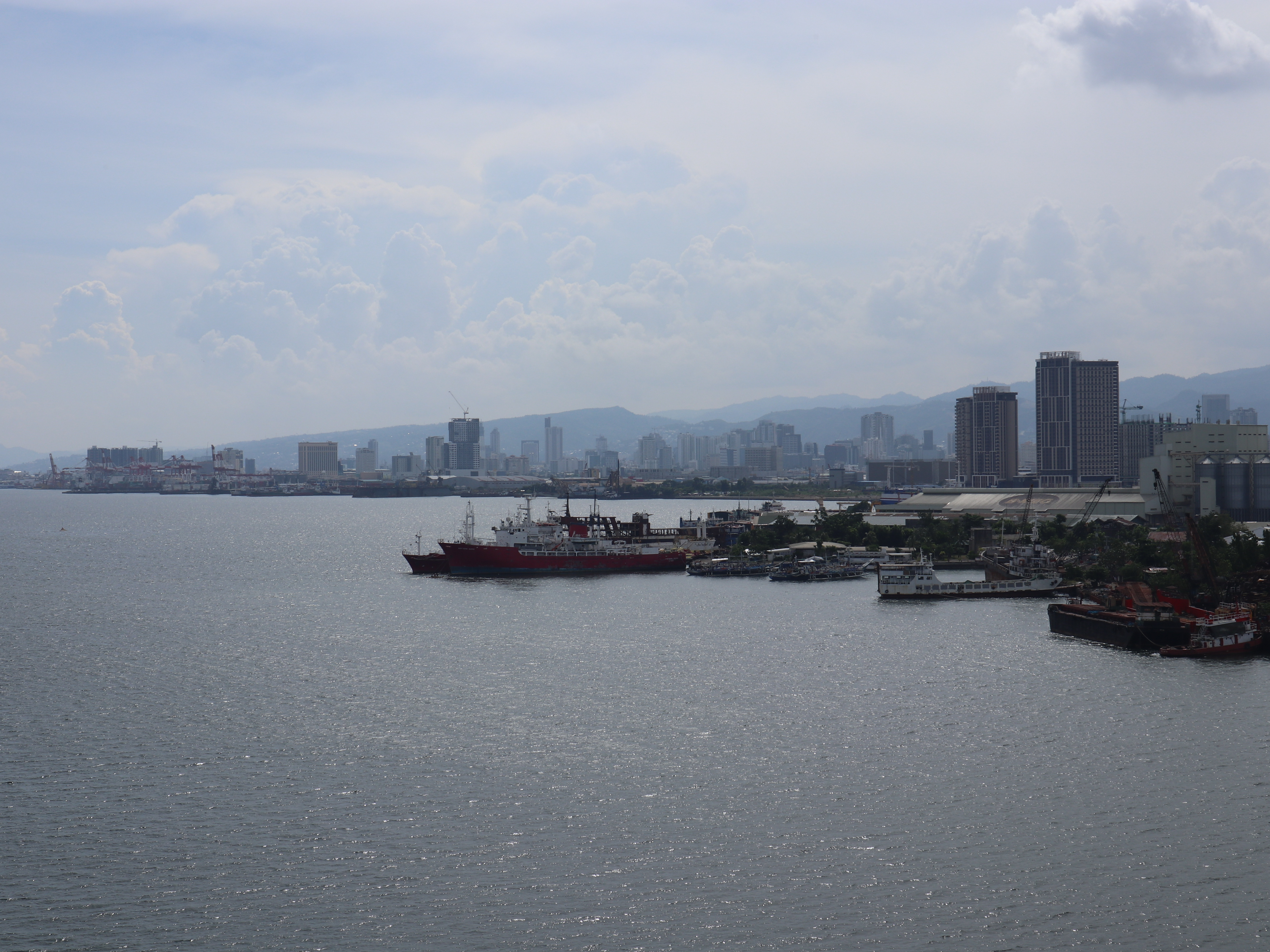
Metro Cebu skyline taken from Mactan-Mandaue Bridge in 2022

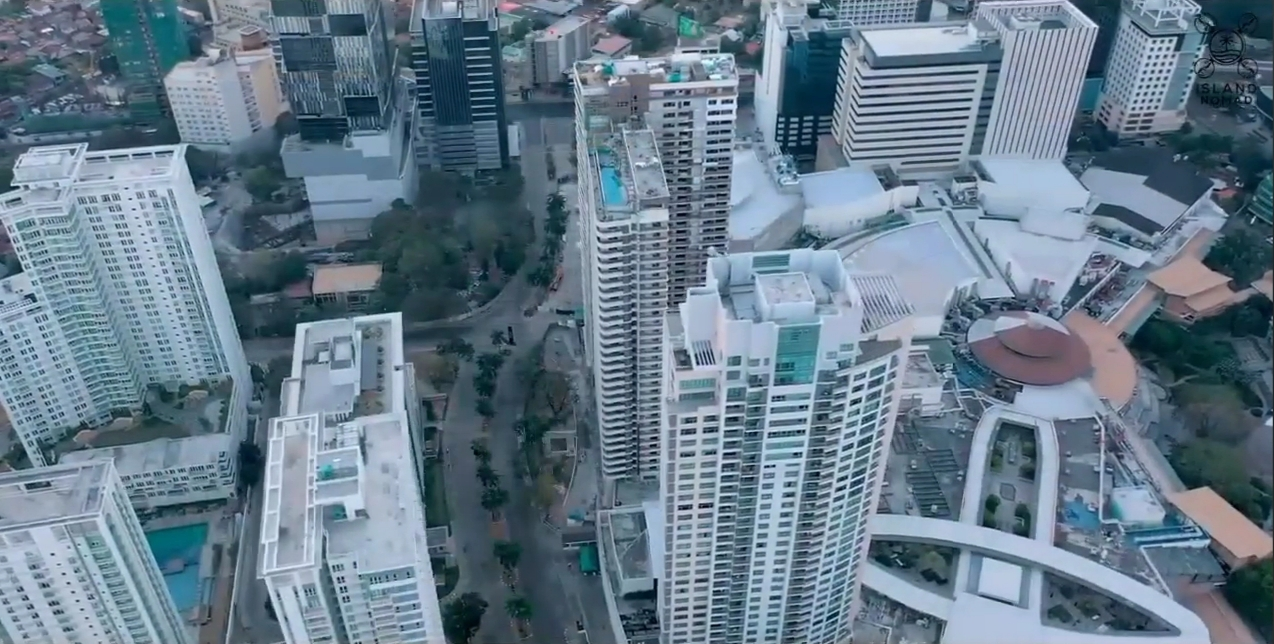
Aerial view of Cebu Business Park in 2021

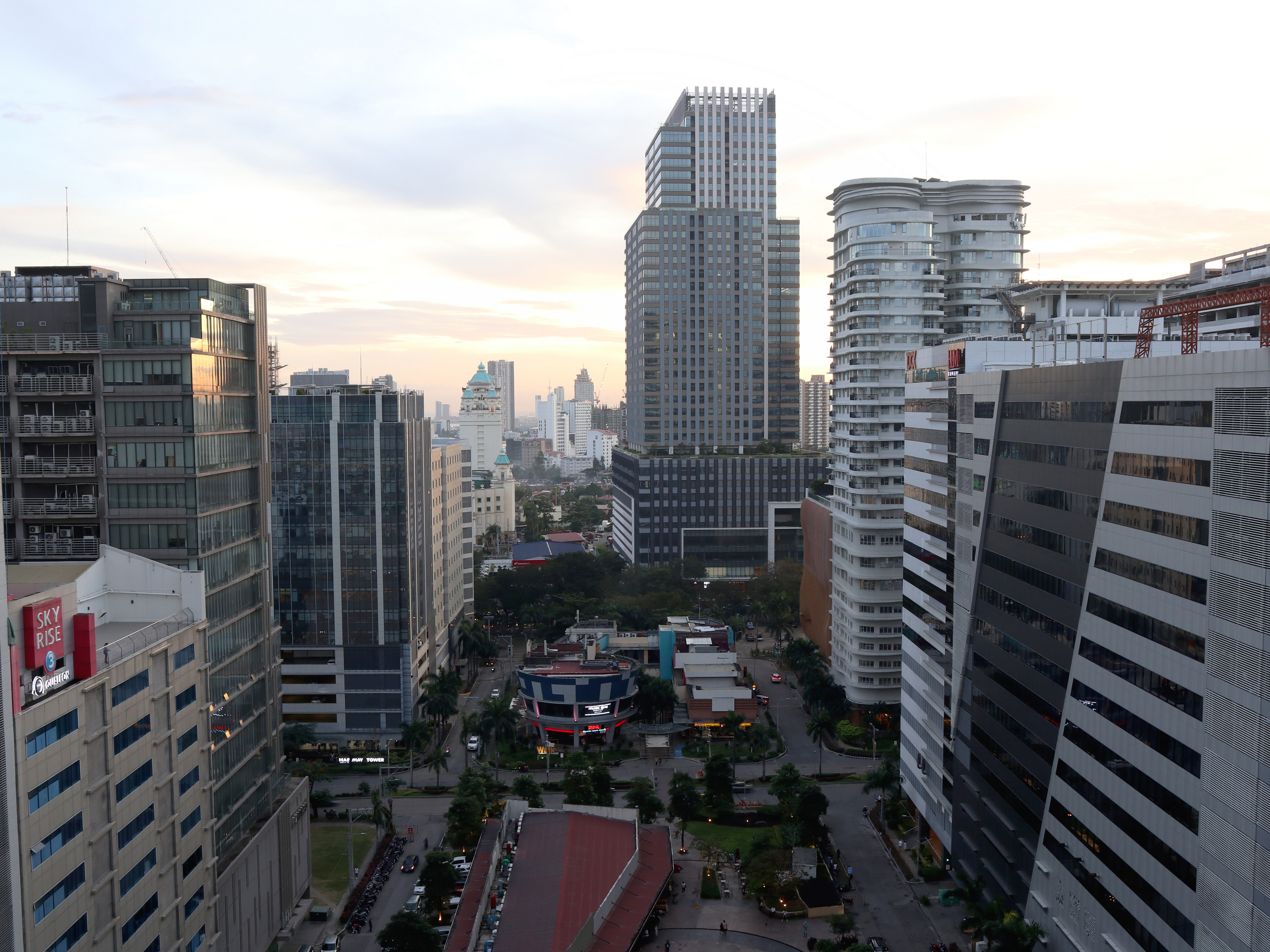
Aerial view of Cebu IT Park in 2024

== Under construction and proposed buildings ==
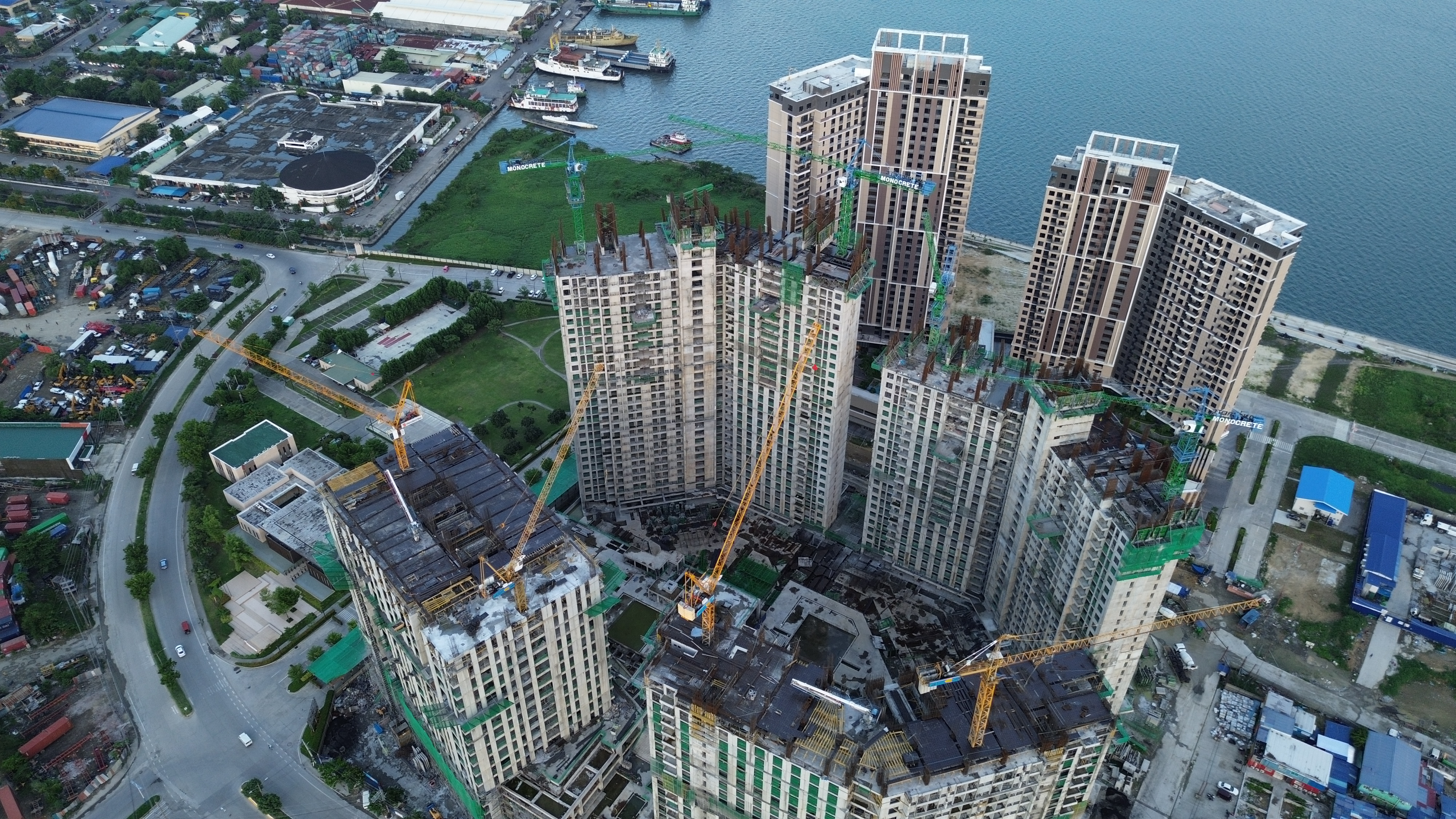
Mandani Bay Quay towers located along the F.E. Zuellig Avenue in Mandaue City under construction

This lists buildings that are either proposed or in the proposal or planning stage in Cebu above 100 metres (328 ft). A floor count of 30 storeys is used as the cutoff for buildings whose heights have not yet been released by its developers.

Name	Height (m)	Storeys	Target Completion	Status	Location		Notes
Name	Height (m)	Storeys	Target Completion	Status	City	Location within the city	Notes
Masters Tower Cebu	172 m (564 ft)	31	2025	Topped-out	Cebu City	Cebu Business Park	The first-ever building designed by Skidmore, Owings, and Merrill (SOM) in the Philippines outside of Metro Manila.
Shang Bauhinia Residences	170 m (560 ft)	50	2028	Under construction	Cebu City	Gov. M. Cuenco Avenue	
Lincoln at IPI Center	163 m (535 ft)	50	2029	Under construction	Cebu City	Pope John Paul II Avenue	
Mandani Bay Quay Tower 1	183 m (600 ft)	49	2025	Topped-out	Mandaue	Mandani Bay	
Mandani Bay Quay Tower 2	183 m (600 ft)	49	2025	Topped-out	Mandaue	Mandani Bay	
Office Building at IPI Center	146 m (479 ft)	36	2029	Proposed	Cebu City	Pope John Paul II Avenue	
Lucima	133 m (436 ft)	37	2025	Topped-out	Cebu City	Cebu Business Park	
128 Nivel Hills Tower 1	130 m (430 ft)	36	2025	Topped-out	Cebu City	Lahug	
128 Nivel Hills Tower 2	130 m (430 ft)	36	2026	Topped-out	Cebu City	Lahug	
Solinea Tower 5 (Cerule)	130 m (430 ft)	37	2025	Topped-out	Cebu City	Cebu Business Park	
Grand Residences Tower 4 (Dusit D2)	120 m (390 ft)	35	2025	Topped-out	Cebu City	Banilad	
Grand Tower Cebu	120 m (390 ft)	30	2025	Topped-out	Cebu City	North Reclamation Area	
Vertex Central	120 m (390 ft)	32	2025	Topped-out	Cebu City	Archbishop Reyes Avenue	
Avida Riala Tower 5	116 m (381 ft)	35	2025	Topped-out	Cebu City	Cebu I.T. Park	
Solinea Tower 4 (Palatine)	116 m (381 ft)	37	2025	Topped-out	Cebu City	Cebu Business Park	
116 Suarez Tower 1	116 m (381 ft)	32	TBA	Under construction	Cebu City	Gorordo Avenue	
116 Suarez Tower 2	116 m (381 ft)	32	TBA	Under construction	Cebu City	N. Escario Street	
One Mandani Bay	114 m (374 ft)	25	2025	Topped-out	Mandaue	Mandani Bay	
Grand San Marino Residences	112 m (367 ft)	32	TBA	Under construction	Cebu City	North Reclamation Area	
Mandani Bay Quay Tower 3	137 m (449 ft)	37	2025	Topped-out	Mandaue	Mandani Bay	
City Clou Tower D	109 m (358 ft)	30	2025	Under construction	Cebu City	D. Jakosalem Street	
City Clou Tower E	109 m (358 ft)	30	2025	Topped-out	Cebu City	D. Jakosalem Street	
GT Times Square	109 m (358 ft)	30	TBA	Topped-out	Cebu City	Capitol Site	Construction started 2009. Currently on-hold.
One Astra Place	104 m (341 ft)	28	2025	Topped-out	Mandaue	A.S. Fortuna Street	
BB Tower	101 m (331 ft)	28	TBA	Proposed	Cebu City	Gorordo Avenue	
City Clou Tower B	101 m (331 ft)	28	2025	Under construction	Cebu City	D. Jakosalem Street	
City Clou Tower C	101 m (331 ft)	28	2025	Topped-out	Cebu City	D. Jakosalem Street	
Marco Polo Oceanview	101 m (331 ft)	28	TBA	Under construction	Cebu City	Lahug	
Taft East Gate Hotel		65	TBA	Proposed	Cebu City	Cardinal Rosales Avenue	
Unnamed Mandani Bay residential building		60	TBA	Proposed	Mandaue	Mandani Bay	
Taft East Gate Tower 3		55	TBA	Proposed	Cebu City	Cardinal Rosales Avenue	
Unnamed Mandani Bay office building		50	TBA	Proposed	Mandaue	Mandani Bay	
Taft East Gate Tower 2		50	TBA	Proposed	Cebu City	Cardinal Rosales Avenue	
Kalea Heights Tower 1		41	TBA	Proposed	Cebu City	Banawa	
Kalea Heights Tower 2		41	TBA	Proposed	Cebu City	Banawa	
Kalea Heights Tower 3		41	TBA	Proposed	Cebu City	Banawa	
Kalea Heights Tower 4		41	TBA	Proposed	Cebu City	Banawa	
Sun Park Royal Hotel and Residences		37	TBA	Proposed	Cebu City	North Reclamation Area	
Arc Towers Office Tower		35	TBA	Proposed	Cebu City	Calamba	
Courtyard by Marriott Cebu City		31	TBA	Under construction	Cebu City	Gorordo Avenue	
Arc Towers Tower 2		30	TBA	Under construction	Cebu City	Calamba	
Avida Towers Gatewalk Tower 1		30	TBA	Proposed	Mandaue	Gatewalk Central	
Vertex Highstreet		30	TBA	Proposed	Cebu City	Sanciangko Street	
Radisson Red Cebu		30	TBA	Topped-out	Mandaue	A.S Fortuna Street	
The Wave Tower 1 - Nagomi Tower		42	TBA	Proposed	Cebu City	Cebu I.T. Park	Will be the tallest residential building in IT Park if finished
The Wave Tower 2		42	TBA	Proposed	Cebu City	Cebu I.T. Park	Will be the tallest residential building in IT Park if finished
Calle 104 -Ranudo Tower		18	2026	Under Construction	Cebu City	F. Ranudo Street	
Calle 104 -Ramos Tower		20	2026	Under Construction	Cebu City	F. Ramos Street	
Filinvest Ciudad Tower 1		48	TBA	Proposed	Cebu City	Apas, Cebu City	
Filinvest Ciudad Tower 2		51	TBA	Proposed	Cebu City	Apas, Cebu City	
Filinvest Ciudad Tower 3		54	TBA	Proposed	Cebu City	Apas, Cebu City	
Mantawi Residences Tower 1		40	TBA	Planned	Mandaue	F.E. Zuellig Avenue, Mandaue City	
Mantawi Residences Tower 2		40	TBA	Proposed	Mandaue	F.E. Zuellig Avenue, Mandaue City	
Mantawi Residences Tower 3		40	TBA	Proposed	Mandaue	F.E. Zuellig Avenue, Mandaue City	
Mantawi Residences Tower 4		40	TBA	Proposed	Mandaue	F.E. Zuellig Avenue, Mandaue City	
Vitale Suites		22	2027	Under construction	Mandaue	Hernan Cortes, Mandaue City	
BE Uptown Park - Residential		25	2030	Under construction	Cebu City	Juana Osmeña Street, Capitol Site, Cebu City	
BE Uptown Park - Hotel		20	2030	Under construction	Cebu City	Juana Osmeña Street, Capitol Site, Cebu City	
Park Inn Hotel			2027	Under construction	Cebu City	South Road Properties	
Radisson			2027	Under construction	Cebu City	South Road Properties	
Le Menda Residences Uptown - Tower 1		38	TBA	Proposed	Cebu City	Hipodromo, Cebu City	
Le Menda Residences Uptown -Tower 2		38	TBA	Proposed	Cebu City	Hipodromo, Cebu City	
Auria Residence		33	TBA	Proposed	Cebu City	Nivel Hills, Lahug	
The Median Flats		38	TBA	Proposed	Cebu City	Apas, Cebu City	

== See also ==
- List of tallest buildings in the Philippines
- List of tallest buildings in Metro Manila
- List of tallest buildings in Iloilo
- List of tallest buildings in Cagayan de Oro
- List of tallest buildings in Davao City
- Top reviewed places in ASEAN
