= Metro Cebu =

Metropolitan area in the Philippines

Metro Cebu Kaulohang Sugbo (Cebuano)
- Metropolitan area
- Metropolitan Cebu
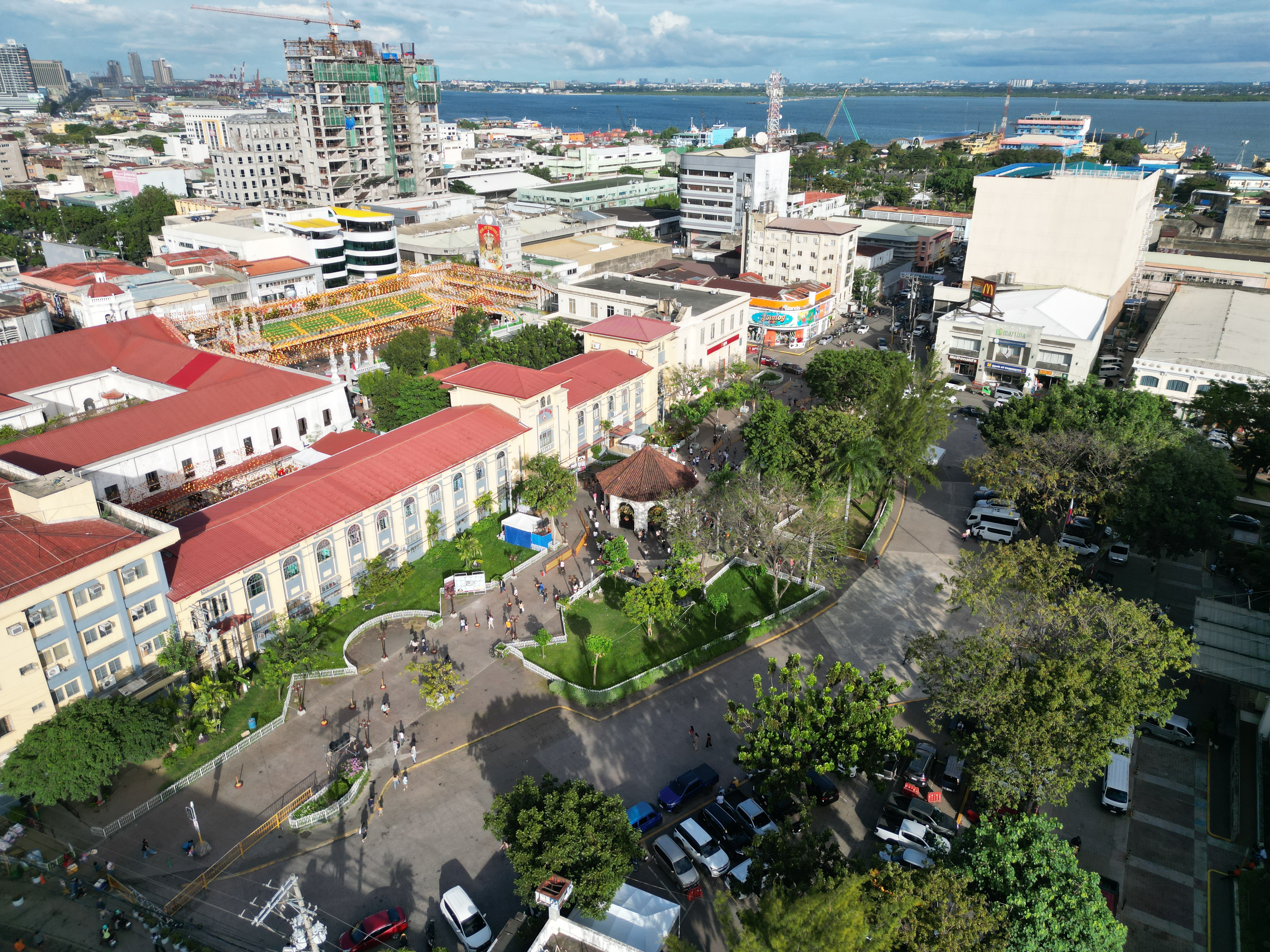
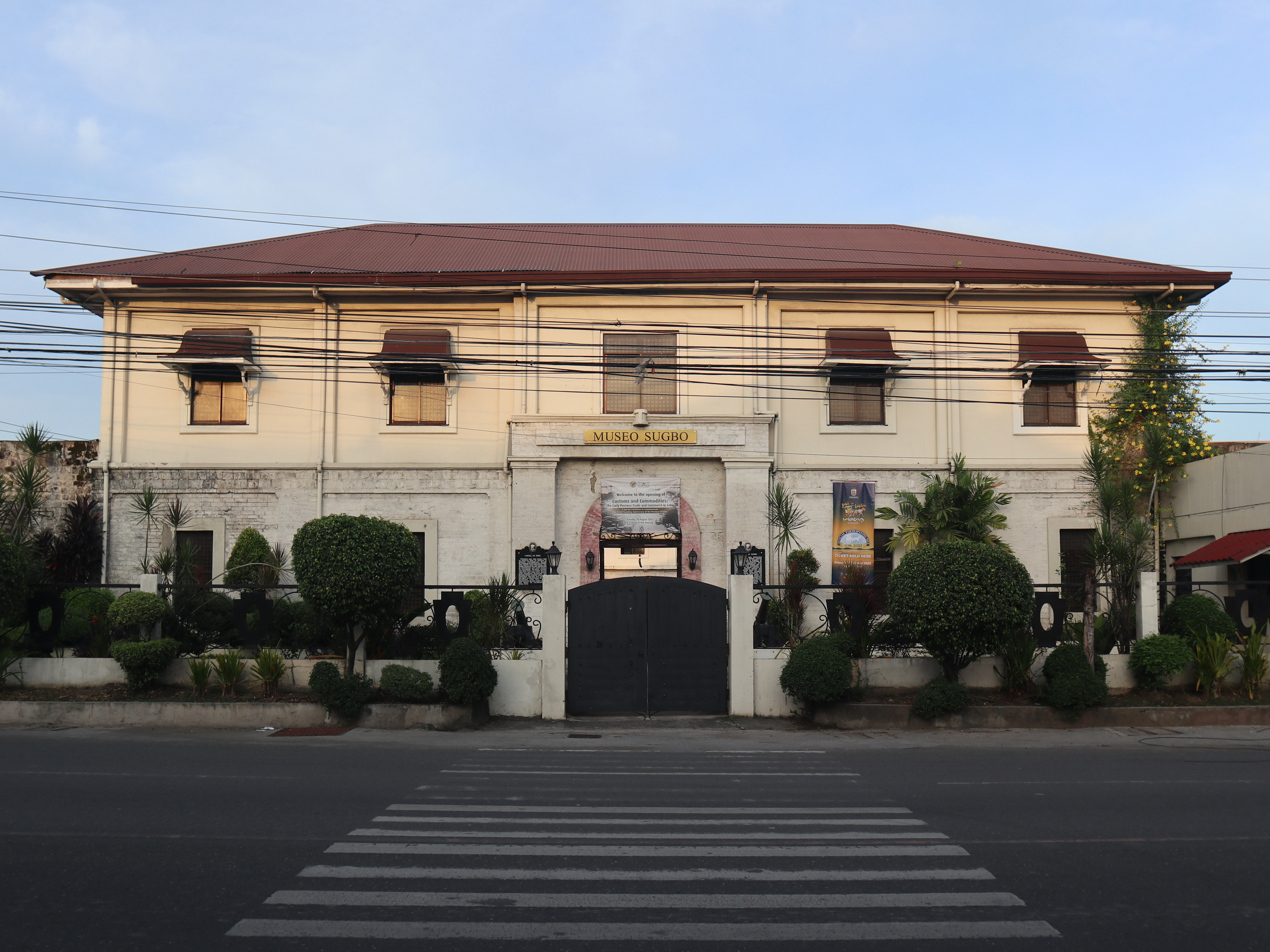
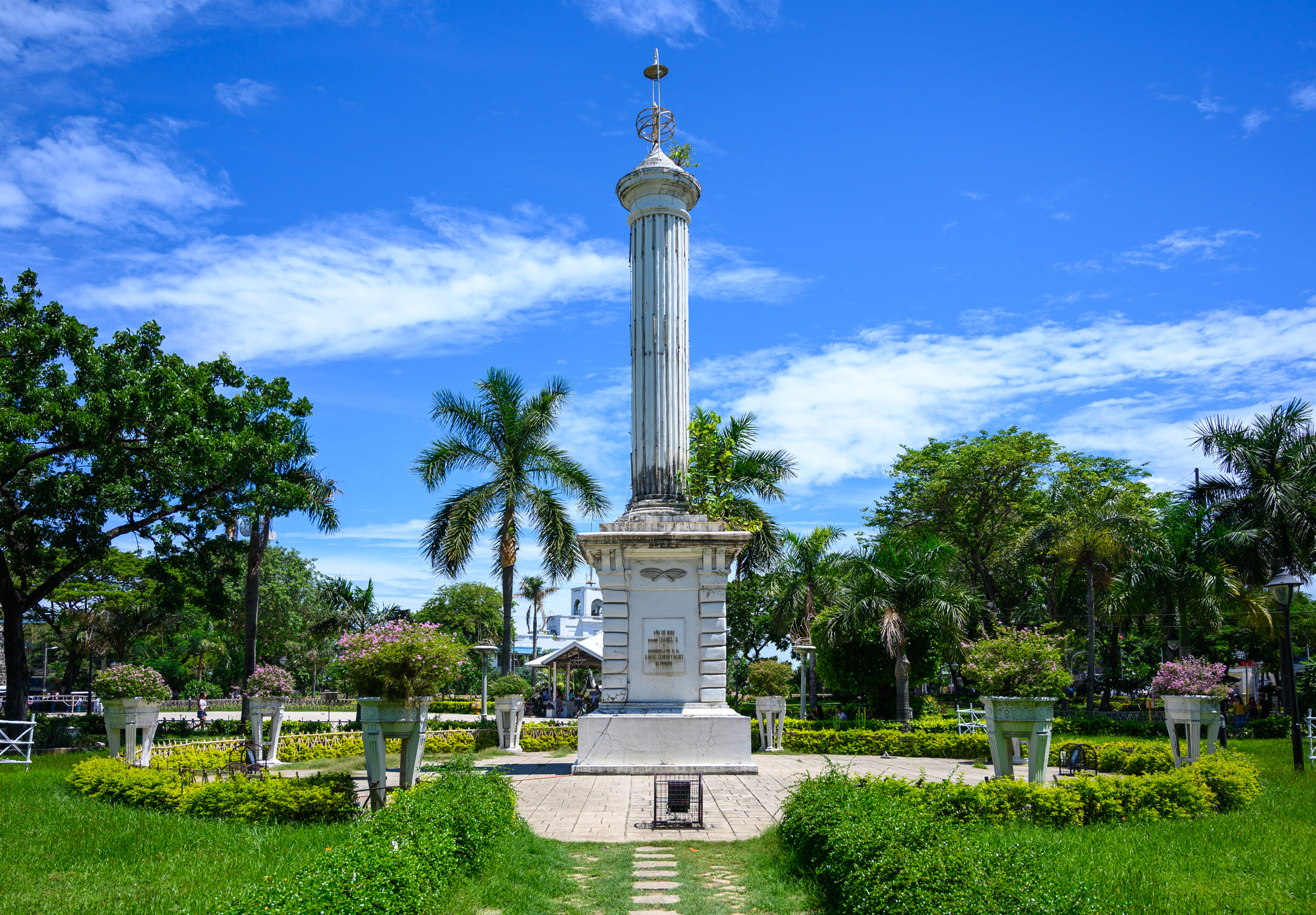
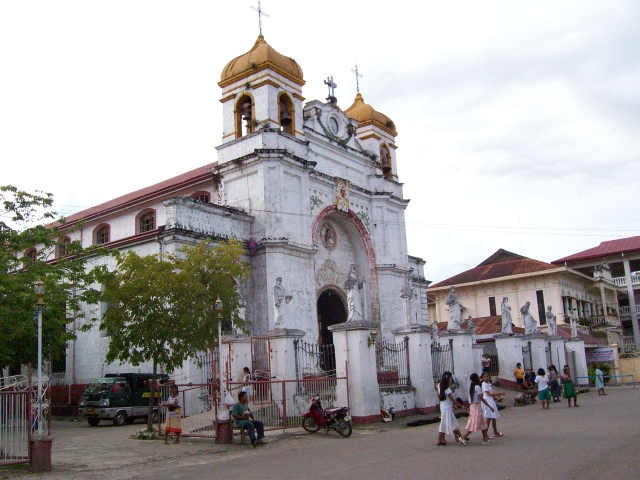
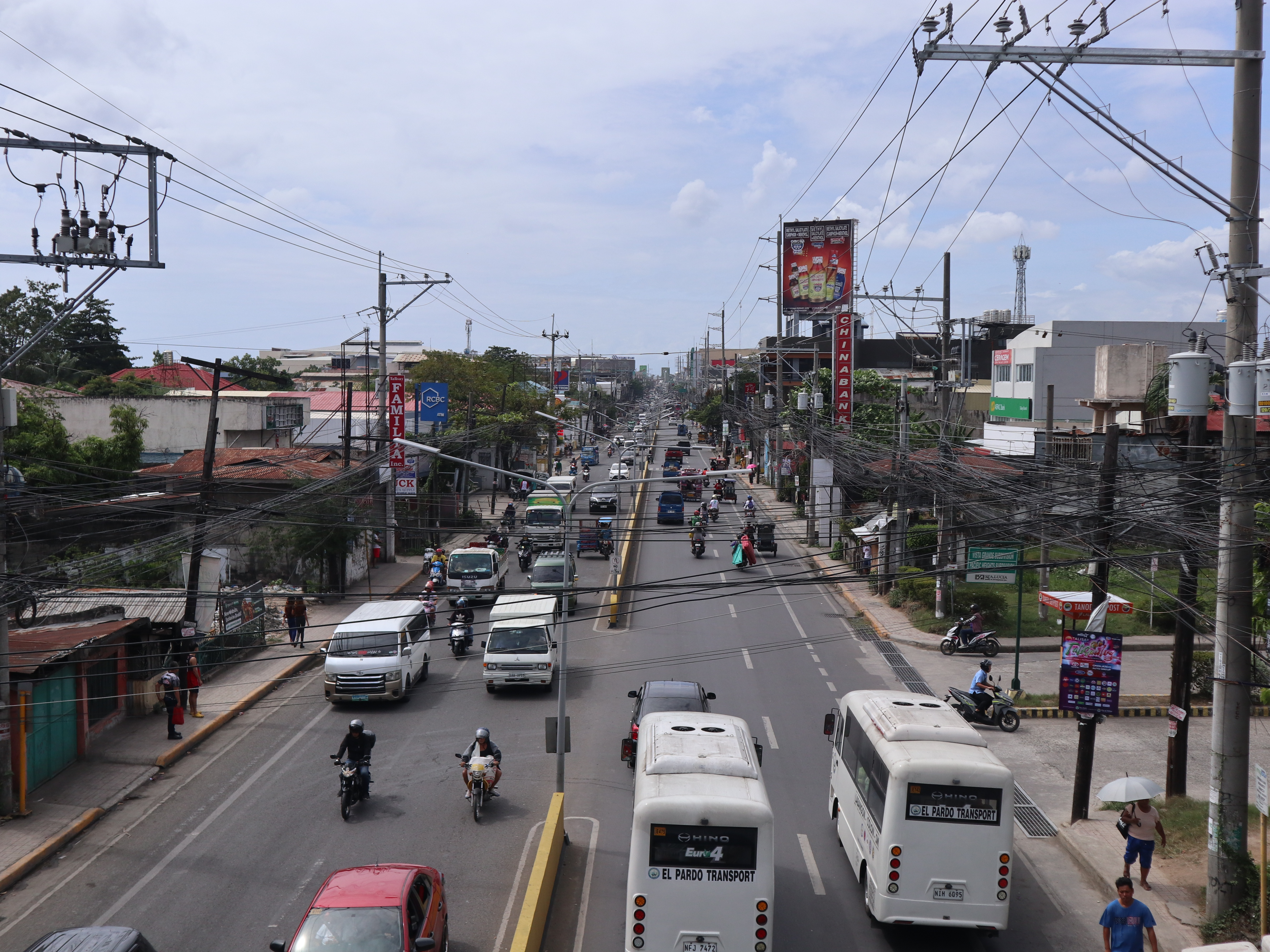
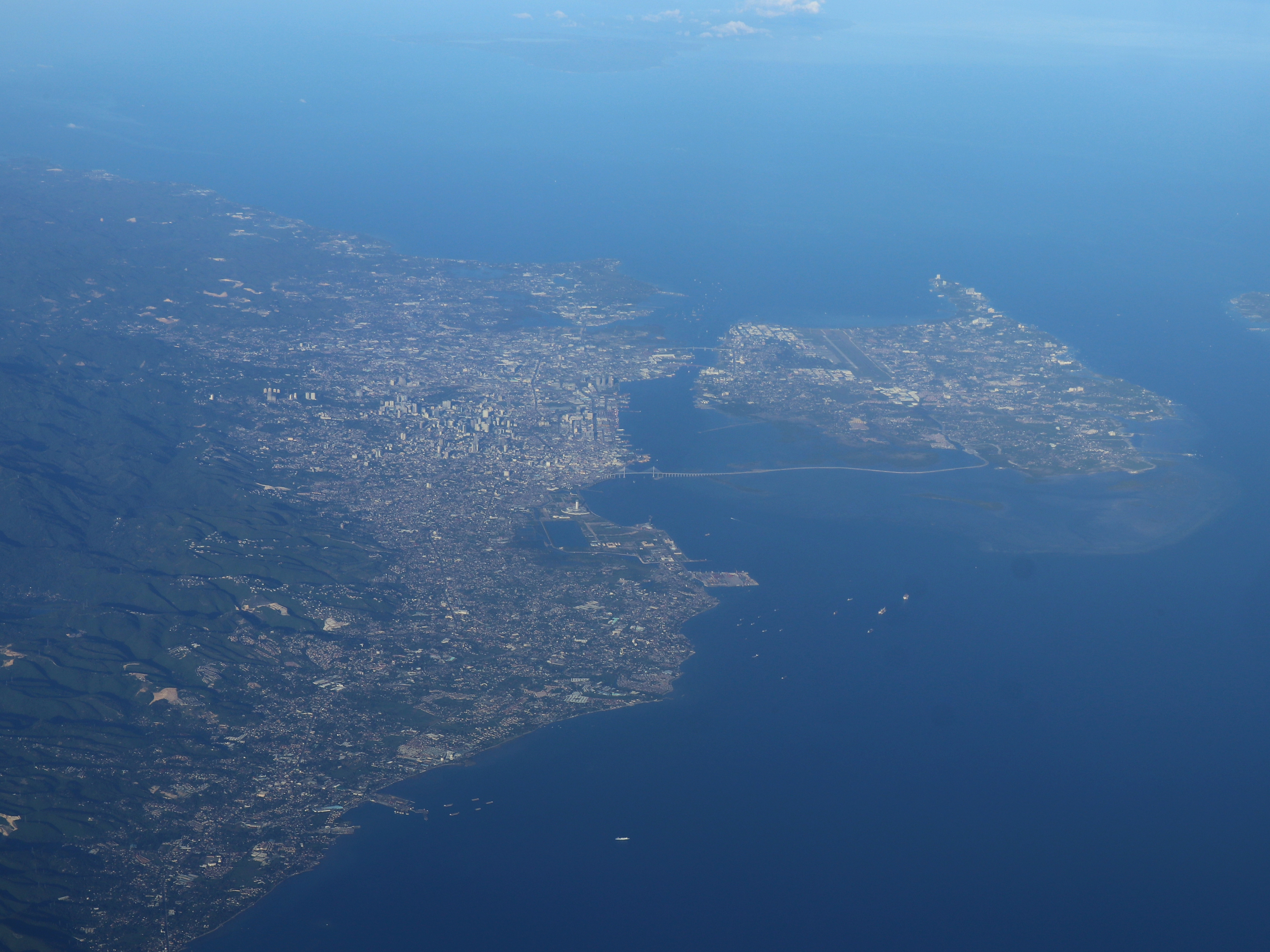
- Plaza Sugbu Museo Sugbu Plaza Independencia St. Catherine of Alexandria Church N. Bacalso Avenue Aerial view of Metro Cebu

- Map of Cebu with Metro Cebu highlighted
- Interactive map of Metro Cebu
- Location within the Philippines
- Coordinates: 10°17′N 123°54′E
- Country: Philippines
- Region: Central Visayas (Region VII)
- Province: Cebu (geographically only)
- Managing entity: Metropolitan Cebu Development and Coordinating Board

Area
  - Metro: 1,062.88 km^{2} (410.38 sq mi)
- Elevation: 17 m (56 ft)

Population (2020)
  - Metro: 3,165,799
  - Density: 2,978.51/km^{2} (7,714.31/sq mi)
- Demonym(s): Cebuano; Cebuana

Divisions
  - Highly urbanized cities: 3: Cebu City; Lapu-Lapu; Mandaue
  - Component cities: 4: Carcar; Danao; Naga; Talisay
  - Municipalities: 6: Compostela; Consolacion; Cordova; Liloan; Minglanilla; San Fernando
  - Barangays: 349
- Time zone: UTC+8 (PST)
- IDD : area code: +63 (0)32

Metropolitan Cebu, or simply Metro Cebu (Cebuano: Kaulohang Sugbo; Filipino: Kalakhang Cebu), is the main urban center of the province of Cebu in the Philippines. Metro Cebu is located along the central eastern portion of the island including the nearby island of Mactan. It accounts for 19.9 percent of the land area and 61.5 percent of the population (2020 census) of the entire province of Cebu.

Metro Cebu is a metropolitan area that consists of Cebu City (the capital of Cebu and the regional center of Central Visayas) along with twelve surrounding cities and municipalities.

The Metropolitan Cebu Development and Coordinating Board (MCDCB) is a body mandated to formulate development plans for the Metro Cebu area and coordinate their implementation. Unlike the Metropolitan Manila Development Authority, the MCDCB does not have legal and institutional powers. However, MMDA's powers are limited by jurisdiction to only the core of the agglomeration.

As of the 2024 census, Metro Cebu is the largest metropolitan area in the Visayas and the third-largest metropolitan area by urban population in the Philippines, after Metro Manila (in Luzon) and Metro Davao (in Mindanao).

== Cities and municipalities ==
Metro Cebu comprises seven cities (Carcar, Cebu City, Danao, Lapu-Lapu, Mandaue, Naga, Talisay) and six municipalities (Compostela, Consolacion, Cordova, Liloan, Minglanilla, San Fernando), with Cebu City serving as the metropolitan area's central core. The provincial capitol, the central business district, major educational institutions and the international port are all located in Cebu City while major industrial companies and factories are located in Mandaue. The international airport and the export processing zone are located in Lapu-Lapu on Mactan Island. Danao is primarily a mining city while Talisay is a residential city with its income generated by small- and medium-sized businesses.

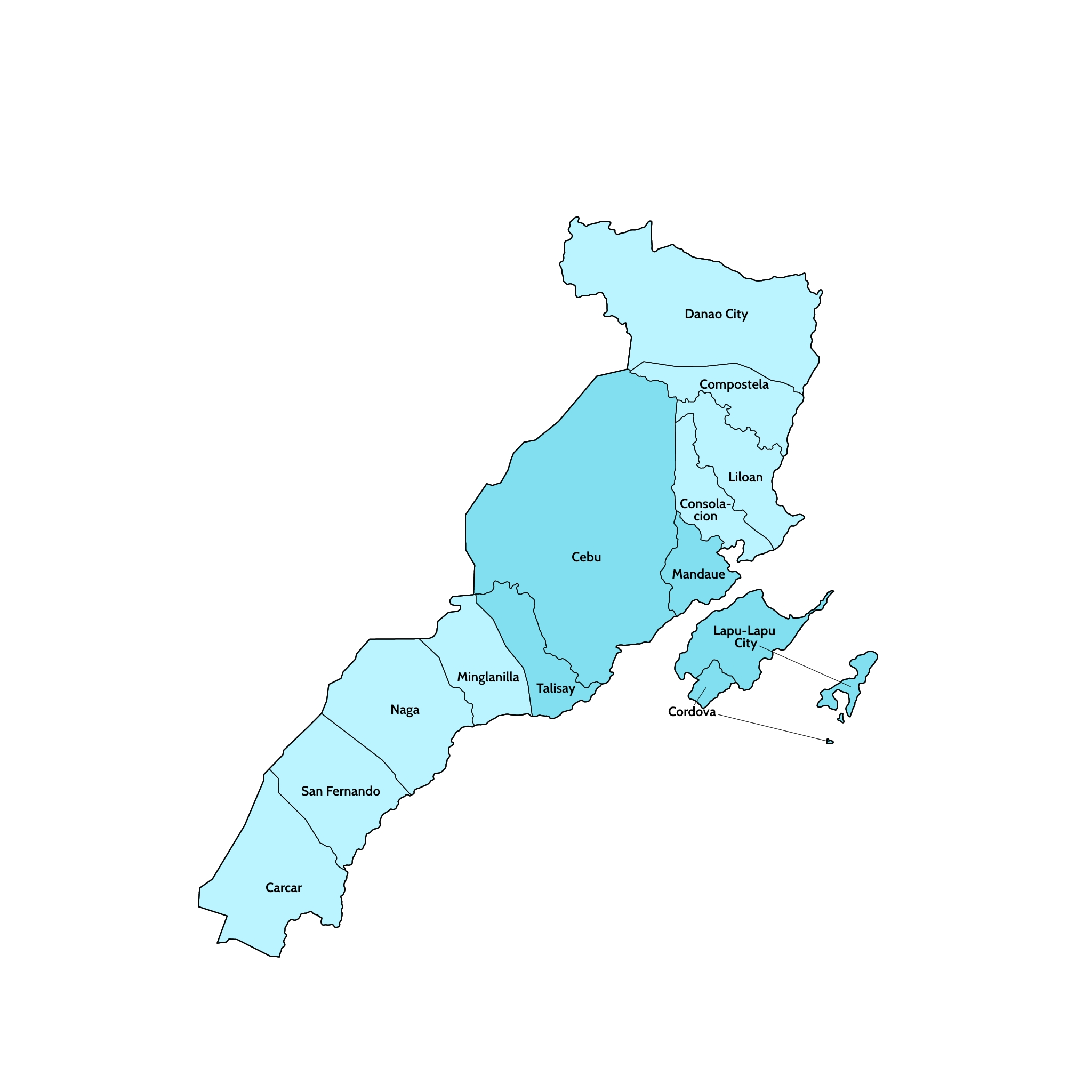
The metropolitan core (dark cyan) is the most densely populated area and the most conurbated. The brightest area on the map is the other cities.

City/Town	Population (2024)	Land Area		Population Density		Classification
City/Town	Population (2024)	Sq. Km.	Sq. Mi.	Sq. Km	Sq. Mi.	Classification
Cebu City	965,332	315.00	121.62	3,064.55	7,937.14	Highly urbanized city
Lapu-Lapu	497,813	58.10	22.43	8,568.21	22,191.56	Highly urbanized city
Mandaue	364,482	34.87	13.46	10,452.60	27,072.10	Highly urbanized city
Talisay	263,832	39.87	15.39	6,617.31	17,138.74	Component city
Danao	161,307	107.30	41.43	1,503.33	3,893.60	Component city
Liloan	158,387	45.92	17.73	3,449.19	8,933.37	Municipality
Minglanilla	155,934	65.60	25.33	2,377.04	6,156.51	Municipality
Consolacion	153,931	37.03	14.30	4,156.93	10,766.39	Municipality
Carcar	140,308	116.78	45.09	1,201.47	3,111.80	Component city
Naga	138,727	101.97	39.37	1,360.47	3,523.60	Component city
San Fernando	76,110	69.39	26.79	1,096.84	2,840.81	Municipality
Cordova	72,915	17.15	6.62	4,251.60	11,011.60	Municipality
Compostela	58,178	53.90	20.81	1,079.37	2,795.55	Municipality
Total / Average	3,207,256	1,062.88	410.38	3,017.51	7,815.33	

== History ==
Cebu City was a fishing village and farming settlement governed by Visayan native kings who traded with the neighboring islands of Malaysia and Indonesia. Cebu was the location of the Rajahnate of Cebu, an Indianized kingdom founded by the half Indian and half Malay, Sri Lumay, from Sumatra.

On 7 April 1521, Portuguese explorer Ferdinand Magellan arrived in Cebu. Magellan failed to successfully claim the Philippines for the crown of Spain as he was killed on Mactan island on 27 April 1521, by its leader, Datu Lapu-lapu.

On 27 April 1565, Spanish explorers led by Miguel López de Legazpi arrived in Cebu from Mexico. The Spaniards renamed the city on 1 January 1571, from San Miguel (Saint Michael) to Villa del Santissimo Nombre de Jesús (Town of the Most Holy Name of Jesus). The island were a former capital city of the Spanish East Indies before the capital city was moved to Manila in 1571.

Mandaue then was known as Mandani ruled by their lord Aponoan. It was formally constituted into a "pueblo" (people) between 1580 and 1700 and was officially known as the Población de Mandaue (Town of Mandaue) in 1899. It emerged into the industrial city of Mandaue. Mandaue became a chartered city on 21 June 1969 through Republic Act 5519. It was considered a highly urbanized city in the year 1991.

Talisay was a former Augustinian order hacienda (estate) in 1648 and became a municipality in 1849. On 30 December 2000, Talisay became a component city by virtue of Republic Act 8979.

Lapu-Lapu city was originally referred to as "Mactan." It later became the town of Opon in 1730, the 7th town founded by the Augustinian Friars in Cebu. The town of Opon became a city on 17 June 1961. Its largest district, Lapu-Lapu, was named after Datu Lapu-Lapu.

Metropolitan Cebu was conceptualized by government planners in the 1970s and was based on the experiences of urban planning in Metro Manila. Metro Cebu represented the province's thriving urban centers that are physically proximate to Cebu City, which is the leading commercial and financial hub in the Visayas and northern Mindanao areas with a population largely dependent on the economic opportunities prevailing in the area.

== People ==
=== Ancestry ===
The people of Cebu are called Cebuanos, which are Visayan people (Bisaya). Some also have Chinese, Japanese, Indian and other foreign ancestries as well as ancestries from other Filipino ethnic groups.

=== Languages ===
Cebuano Bisaya is the most common casual vernacular language spoken in Metro Cebu. English is commonly used as a formal language in educational institutions and business transactions. Other languages also spoken include Chinese (such as Philippine Hokkien, usually by Chinese Filipinos), Tagalog (Filipino) via Filipino mass media and Filipino class, though Tagalog not as widely spoken as Cebuano even though it is spoken through most of the rest of Cebu province, as taught in schools in Cebu and a range of other Visayan languages from neighboring regions and islands. Mandarin (Standard Chinese) is also taught in Chinese class of Chinese Filipino schools and few other schools in Cebu.

== Education ==
Metro Cebu is the seat of more than a dozen educational institutions, the oldest of which is the University of San Carlos. Some of these institutions include, in alphabetical order:

- Asian College of Technology (1988)
- Cebu Doctors' University (1975)
- Cebu Eastern College (1915)
- Cebu Institute of Medicine (1957)
- Cebu Institute of Technology – University (1946)
- Cebu Normal University (1902)
- Cebu Technological University (1911)
- Colegio de la Inmaculada Concepcion (1880)
- Don Bosco Technical College–Cebu (1954)
- Saint Theresa's College of Cebu (1933)
- Southwestern University (1946)
- University of Cebu (1964)
- University of San Carlos (1595)
- University of San Jose–Recoletos (1947)
- University of Southern Philippines Foundation (1927)
- University of the Philippines Cebu (1918)
- University of the Visayas (1919)
- Velez College (1957)

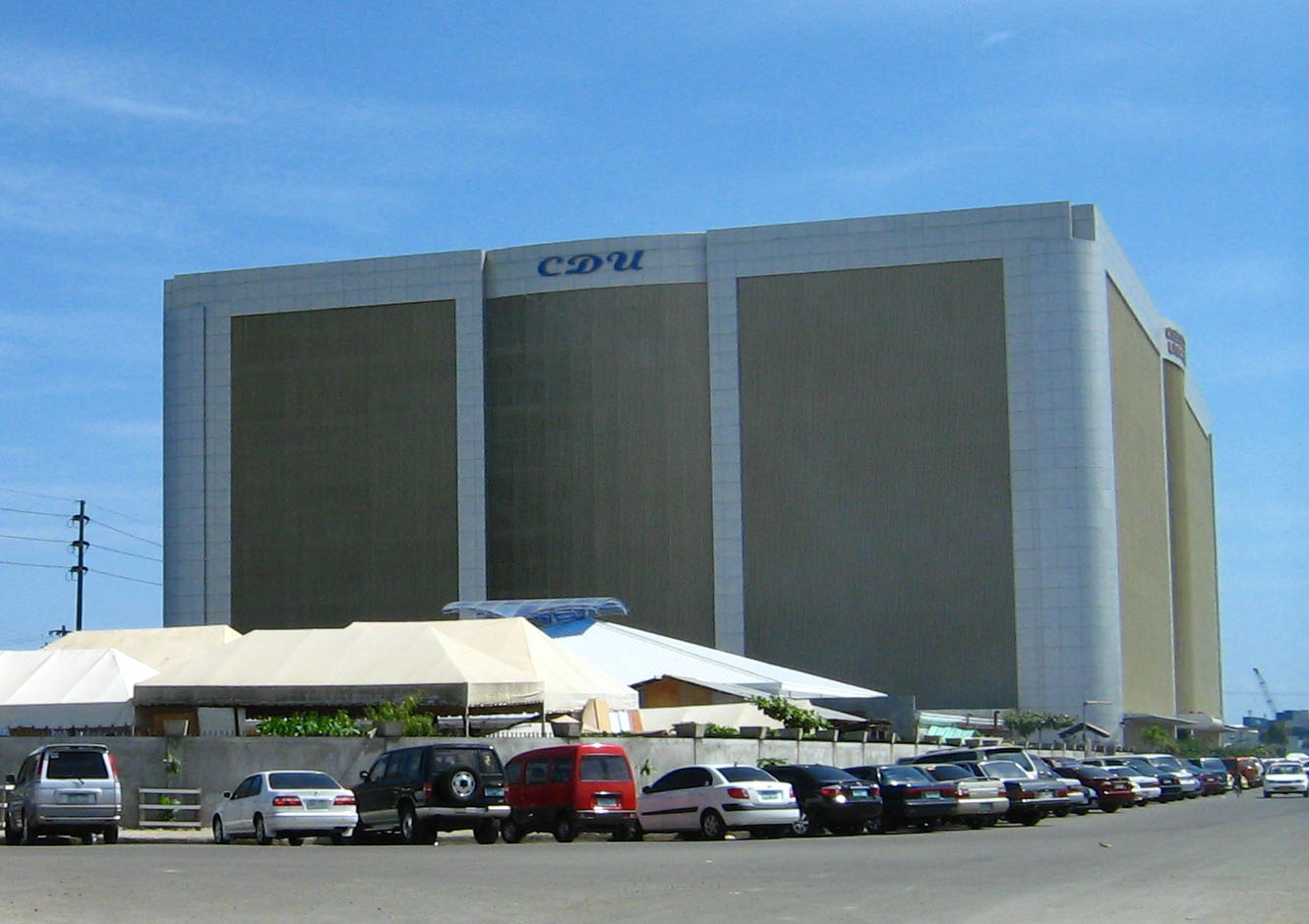
Cebu Doctors' University situated in Mandaue City

A large number of students from neighboring provinces in the Visayas, as well as northern Mindanao, prefer to go to Metro Cebu to take up tertiary-level education.

There is also a sizable number of South Korean, Iranian, Sub-Saharan African, and South Indian students who take up tertiary-level courses in Metro Cebu, taking advantage of Metro Cebu's, and the Philippines', lower cost of education relative to their home countries.

Cebu has four internationally connected educational institutions: Cebu International School and CIE British School are located in Cebu City; Singapore School Cebu and Woodridge International School are located in Mandaue.

== Healthcare ==
Metro Cebu also has several hospitals and clinics, there are two types of hospitals in Metro Cebu: the public hospitals which is owned by the government. Some public hospitals in Metro Cebu are the Vicente Sotto Memorial Medical Center, Cebu City Medical Center and there are also few public district hospitals which are also managed by the provincial government of Cebu.

Some of the private hospitals in Metro Cebu are the Chong Hua Hospital, Cebu Doctors' University Hospital, University of Cebu Medical Center, Perpetual Succor Hospital and Cebu Institute of Medicine Hospital.

== Events ==
=== 2004 presidential inauguration ===
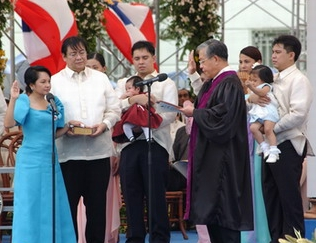
Arroyo taking her Oath of Office in Cebu City on 30 June 2004

On 30 June 2004, Gloria Macapagal Arroyo was the first Philippine President to be inaugurated in Metro Cebu. The inauguration was done in front of Cebu Provincial Capitol in Cebu City. This was done in gratitude for the support given to her by the people of Cebu during the election. In a break with tradition, she delivered her inaugural address in Manila before departing for Cebu for her inauguration.

=== 2005 Southeast Asian Games ===
Metro Cebu and other key Philippine cities hosted the 2005 Southeast Asian Games. The event was held from 27 November to 5 December 2005. Venues for this event includes the Cebu City Sports Complex, Cebu Coliseum, Mandaue Coliseum, University of San Carlos and parts of Danao.

The Philippine SEA Games Committee wanted to decentralize the games from Manila, so that other cities of the country could experience the SEA Games.

Metro Cebu hosted six sports.

Sport	Venue	City
Dancesport	Waterfront Cebu City Hotel & Casino	Cebu City
Pencak Silat	Cebu Coliseum	Cebu City
Sepak Takraw	University of San Carlos	Cebu City
Judo	Mandaue Coliseum	Mandaue City
Karate	Mandaue Coliseum	Mandaue City
Mountain Biking	Ramon M. Durano Sports Complex	Danao City

=== 2007 ASEAN Summit and 2nd East Asia Summit ===
The 12th Summit of the Association of Southeast Asian Nations (ASEAN), originally scheduled for 10–14 December 2006 was postponed to January 2007 due to Typhoon Utor and the consideration of the safety and welfare of the participants.

The Cebu International Convention Center is a structure built by the Cebu provincial government in time for the 12th ASEAN Summit and 2nd East Asia Summit at a cost of around US$10-million dollars, US$5-million dollars more than expected. It is a three-storey structure with a total floor area of 25,000 square metres (270,000 sq ft) and situated on 3.8 hectares (9.4 acres) of land at the Mandaue Reclamation Area.

=== 51st International Eucharistic Congress ===
The 2016 International Eucharistic Congress, held on 24–31 January 2016, was a gathering of Roman Catholic priests, bishops, lay people, nuns and representatives from different parts of the world. The 8-day congress was observed with religious activities like cathechisis, processions and seminars, It was ended with a Statio Orbis or Closing Mass held at South Road Properties on 31 January 2016, it was attended by the Papal Legate, Cardinal Charles Maung Bo.

== Utilities ==
=== Communication ===
Globe Innove IT Plaza

Philippine Long Distance Telephone Company (PLDT) is the major phone carrier in the metropolis and the entire province. Globelines Innove and Islacom, both subsidiaries of Globe Telecom came in after the passage of the Telecommunications Act of 1995.

There are three wireless telecommunication companies serving Metro Cebu as well as the rest of the Philippines. These are:

- Smart Communications/Pilipino Telecommunications Corp., a PLDT subsidiary – using the brands: Smart, Talk 'n' Text, Sun Cellular, and Addict Mobile
- Globe Telecom – using the brands: Globe and TM
- Dito Telecommunity – using the brand Dito

=== Electricity ===
Metro Cebu's electricity is mostly supplied from Leyte Geothermal Power Plants operated by PNOC-EDC which is interconnected across Cebu through electrical submarine cables operated by TransCo. It is transmitted by the state-owned National Transmission Corporation (TransCo) through several high tension wires. It is stored and distributed by the Visayan Electric Company (VECO), except in the island of Mactan (Lapu-Lapu City and Cordova) which is served by the Mactan Electric Company, the city of Carcar, which is served by Cebu I Electric Cooperative (CEBECO I), and the city of Danao and the municipality of Compostela, which are served by Cebu II Electric Cooperative (CEBECO II). They put out 220VAC 50 Hz.

=== Water ===
In 1974 the Metropolitan Cebu Water District (MCWD) took over in distributing potable water to the whole metropolis after the Osmena Waterworks System suffered financial losses. MCWD supplies potable water to the cities of Cebu, Mandaue, Lapu-lapu and Talisay and the municipalities of Consolacion, Liloan, Compostela and Cordova from their reservoirs in Lake Plumbero, Minglanilla; Buhisan Reservoir in Cebu City; Casili in Consolacion and Mananga in Talisay.

Water shortage has always been a problem in Metro Cebu due to deforestation and seawater intrusion of the underground water supply. There was a proposal to acquire water from nearby Bohol island because of the water crisis in the metropolis.

In 1998, the Mananga Phase I Project located in Maghuway, Talisay was completed producing an additional 33,000 cubic metres (33,000,000 L; 8,700,000 US gal) of potable water per day. And the other area through a series of 5HP submersible pumps powered by Solar Electric Energy (note: Operates only during daytime) in Minglanilla near Lake Plumbero.

== Transportation ==
=== Roads ===
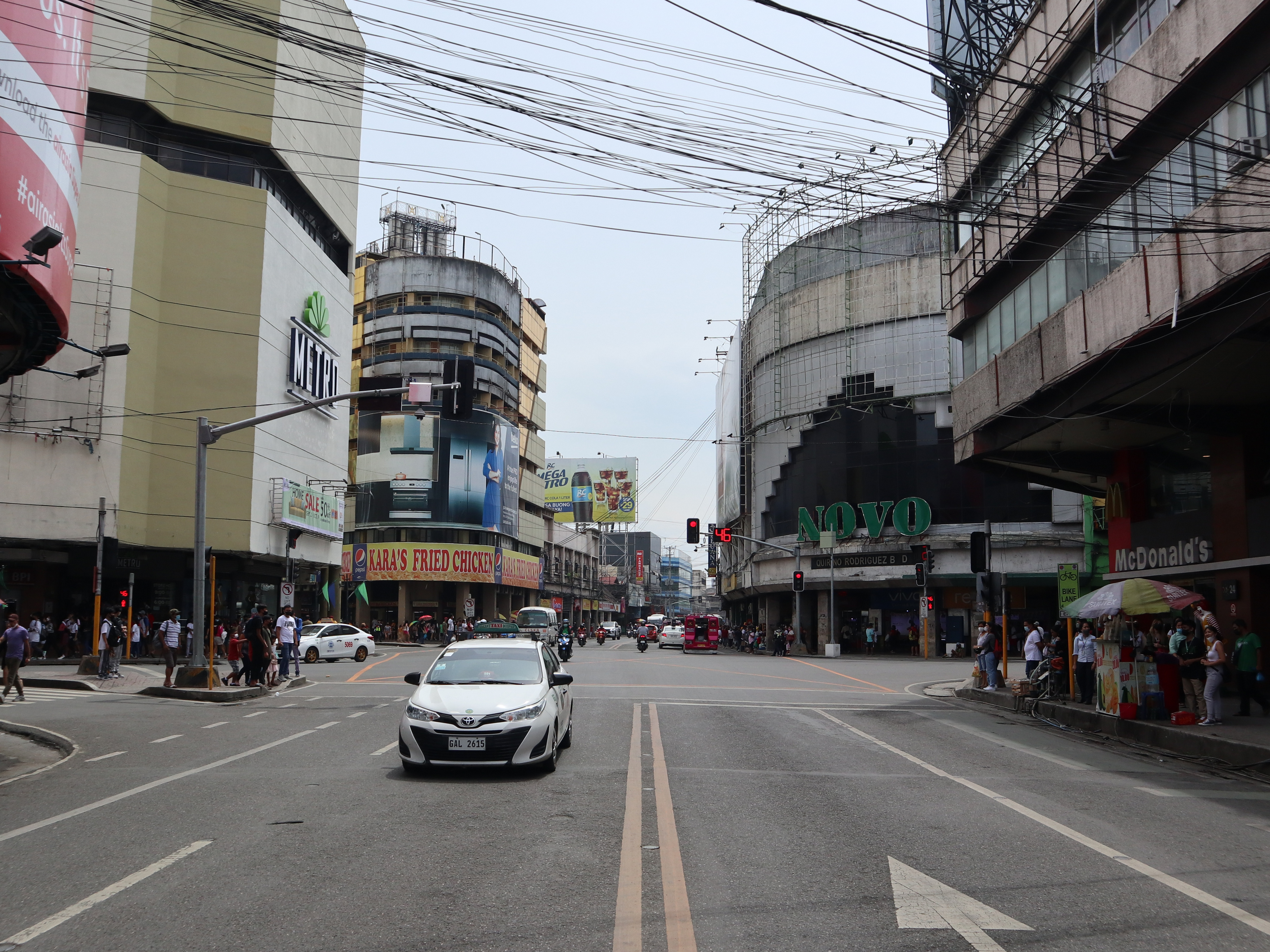
Colon Street is one of the oldest roads in the Philippines.

Metro Cebu's roadways are among the country's busiest and most congested. The south highway, Osmeña Boulevard, Colon Street, and V. Rama are Metro Cebu's major roads. A new highway called the South Coastal Road or the Cebu Coastal Road was completed in 2010. The 12 kilometer, 4-lane highway was created to improve traffic in Metro Cebu. It connects Cebu City, Talisay and other southern municipalities. In conjunction with the development of the Cebu South Coastal Road, a roadway underpass nearly a kilometer long also connects the South Coastal Road with the Serging Osmeña Boulevard in the North Reclamation Area. Other planned projects include a series of flyovers in the north district, the Cebu North Coastal Road and Cloverleaf interlink road project.

Mactan is connected to the island of Cebu via two bridges: the Marcelo Fernan Bridge and the much older, Mactan-Mandaue Bridge. The third Cebu-Mactan link which is the Cebu–Cordova Bridge is complete and was opened to the public in 2022.

=== Airport ===
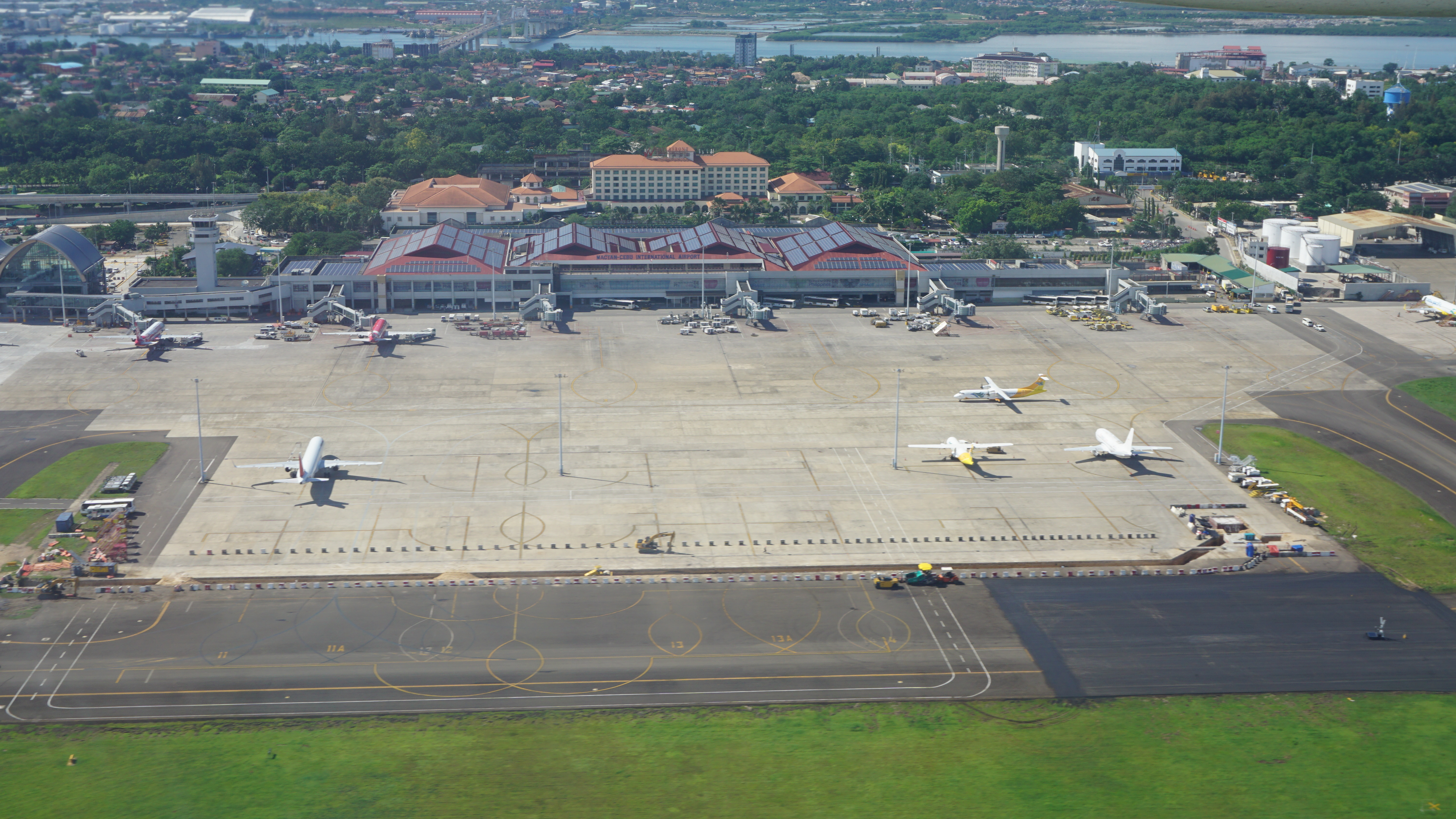
Aerial view of Mactan–Cebu International Airport Terminal 1 at Lapu-Lapu City.

Mactan–Cebu International Airport's recently opened Terminal 2.

Mactan–Cebu International Airport (MCIA) is, officially, the only airport in the Metro Cebu. Located in Lapu-Lapu, it is the second busiest airport in the Philippines, after Metro Manila's Ninoy Aquino International Airport.

It has two terminals. Terminal 1 is used solely for domestic flights, while Terminal 2, which was opened on July 1, 2018, serves international flights. Together the two terminals have a total capacity of 12.5 million.

The number of weekly international flights to and from MCIA has constantly increased over the years. Currently, there are direct regular and/or charter flights to the following international destinations: Changi Airport, Hong Kong Airport, Narita Airport, Kansai Airport, Nagoya Airport, Incheon Airport, Busan Airport, Taoyuan Airport, Kuala Lumpur Airport, Xiamen Airport, Dubai Airport, Doha, Pudong Airport, and Nanning Airport.

Metro Cebu's MCIA is the international gateway to the economic hub of the Central and Southern Philippines. There are numerous daily flights between Cebu and most Philippine cities. Air freight to and from Cebu is reliable and efficient with major international couriers like FedEx, Fastpak Global Express, and 2GO operating here.

=== Seaport ===
Metro Cebu's Port of Cebu is the busiest domestic seaport in the Philippines. Along with the ports areas of Mandaue and Lapu-Lapu, Cebu's "seaport complex" is considered as the busiest port in the Philippines in terms of number of annual passengers. It is also the main port of entry in the province of Cebu and Central Visayas Region. It plays a vital role in the Philippine's shipping industry with about 80 percent of the country's shipping companies that are based here. The port is located at the center of the province's east coast. It is nestled in a natural harbor in the narrow strait between Cebu City and Mactan, the latter providing a natural cover and breakwater, making the port one of the safest and operational the whole year round.

Cebu International Port and Cebu Domestic Port serves container vessels and passenger ships with destinations around the country and the world. Cebu International Port is a multipurpose terminal covering an area of 10 hectares with 690 meters of berthing space and a controlling draught of minus 8.5 meters at MLLW. The Cebu Baseport – Domestic Zone is the area for the domestic transactions of different business coming from and going to the different island of the archipelago. It is dedicated to coastwise shipping with 3.5 kilometers of berthing space, 3 finger piers and 3 passenger terminals.

=== Urban transit systems ===
The planned bus rapid transit system and Cebu UMRT aim to alleviate congestion in the metropolis.

== Economy ==
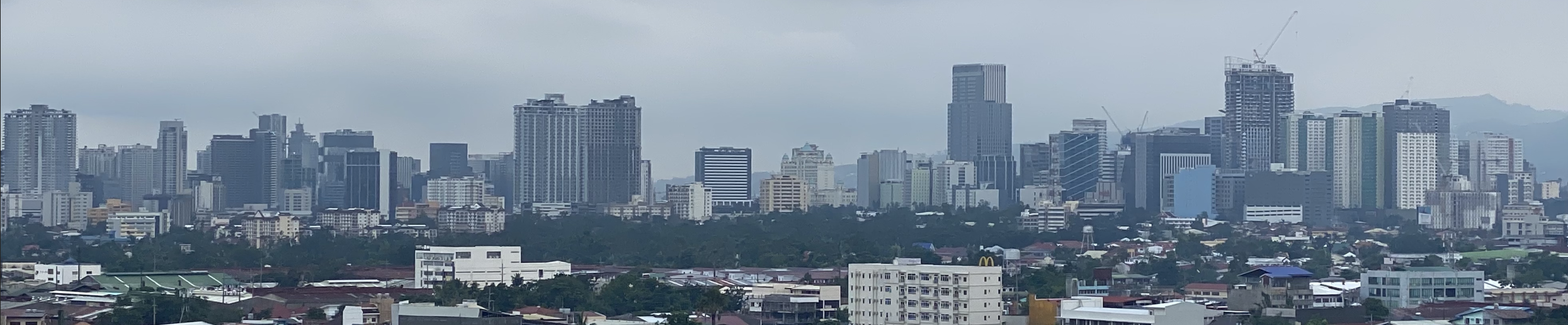
The skyline of Cebu City in 2022, with the Cebu Business Park, Cebu IT Park, and the Cebu Exchange being prominent landmarks. Horizons 101, the city's tallest building, and the Crown Regency Hotel and Towers can be seen from behind The Alcoves alongside the under-construction Johndorf Tower.

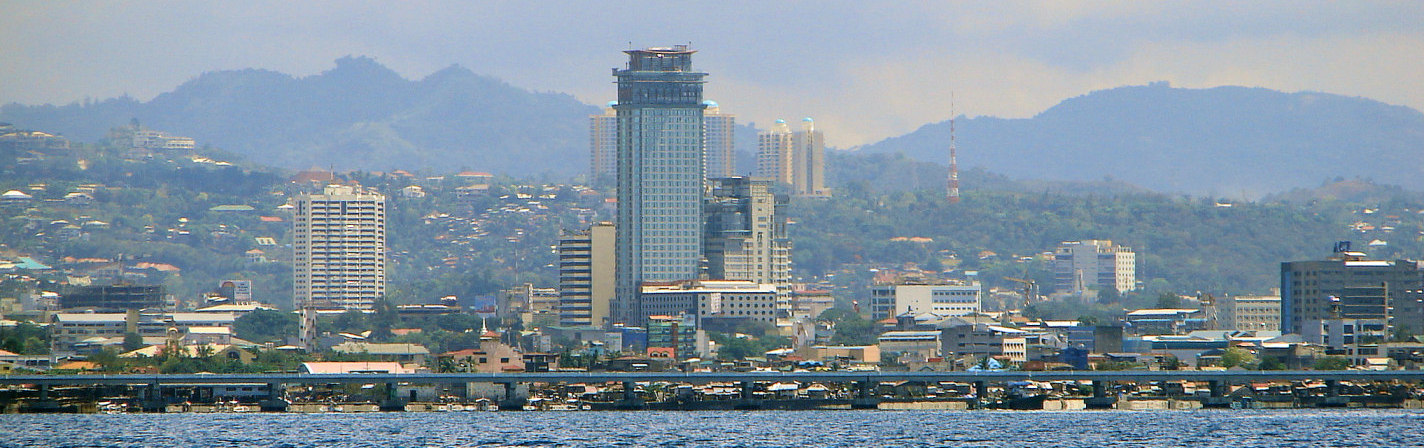
Skyline of Metropolitan Cebu as seen from Mactan Channel (2009)

Metro Cebu, as the second most important metropolitan area of the Philippines, has established itself as a major economic hub, attracting several multinational companies in various industries ranging from business process outsourcing, electronics, pharmaceuticals, and tourism, among other industries. Metro Cebu, and Cebu province as a whole, has experienced rapid economic growth since the early 1990s, a phenomenon also known as Ceboom, a portmanteau of "Cebu" and "boom". Cebu City, Lapu-Lapu City, and Mandaue, also collectively known as the "tri-cities", the three largest and highly urbanized cities of Metro Cebu, account for 22.2%, 11.3%, and 8.3% of Central Visayas' gross regional domestic product respectively as of 2020.

Cebu City is the primary economic center of Metro Cebu. Historically, Colon Street and its surrounding areas collectively known as "Downtown Cebu", was the major economic center of Cebu, but development has since spread to other parts of Metro Cebu with the opening of newer and more modern developments such as Cebu Business Park and Cebu IT Park (collectively known as the Cebu Park District), which is the home of many business processing outsourcing companies, among other industries. The South Road Properties, a 300-hectare reclamation project in the city's South district is poised to become a major economic hub for Metro Cebu.

Major industrial factories are found in Mandaue, but the city's North Reclamation Area (also known as New Mandaue City) has seen various mixed-use developments since the 2010s, including the Mandani Bay project.

Lapu-Lapu City, where the Mactan Airport is located, is a major tourism hub, being the home to several resorts and hotels. Lapu-Lapu City is also the home to the Mactan Export Processing Zone and the Cebu Light Industrial Park, where factories of several multinational firms are located.

The other cities and municipalities of Metro Cebu remain primarily residential with several subdivisions (or suburbs), with residents commuting to the "tri-cities" for work, but are also poised for more opportunities, with developments such as the Minglanilla Techno-Business Park in Minglanilla and the New Cebu International Container Port in Consolacion seen to accommodate industries for businesses to set up shop outside of Metro Cebu's traditional core of Cebu City, Lapu-Lapu City, and Mandaue.

== Metropolitan Cebu Development and Coordinating Board ==
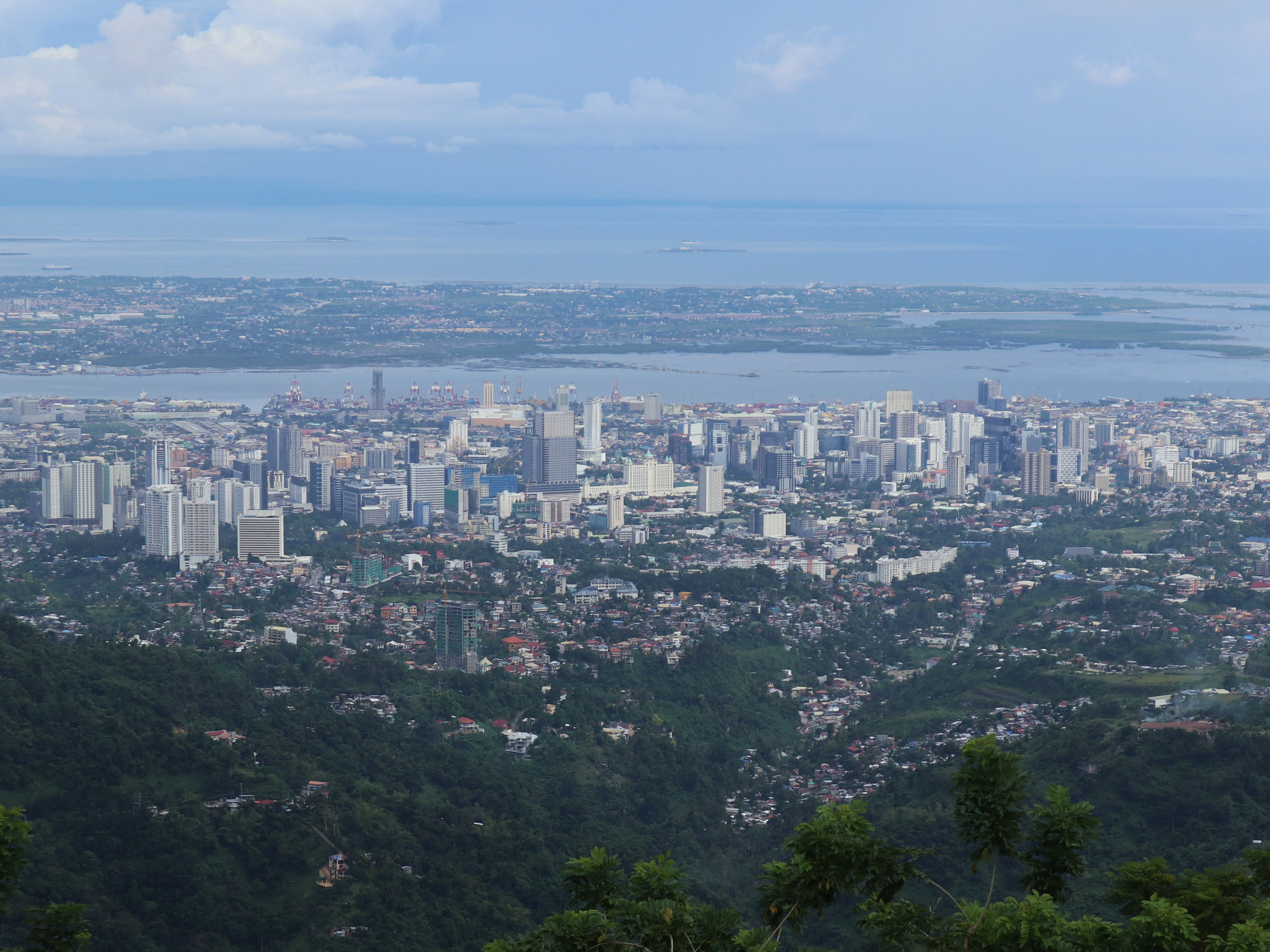

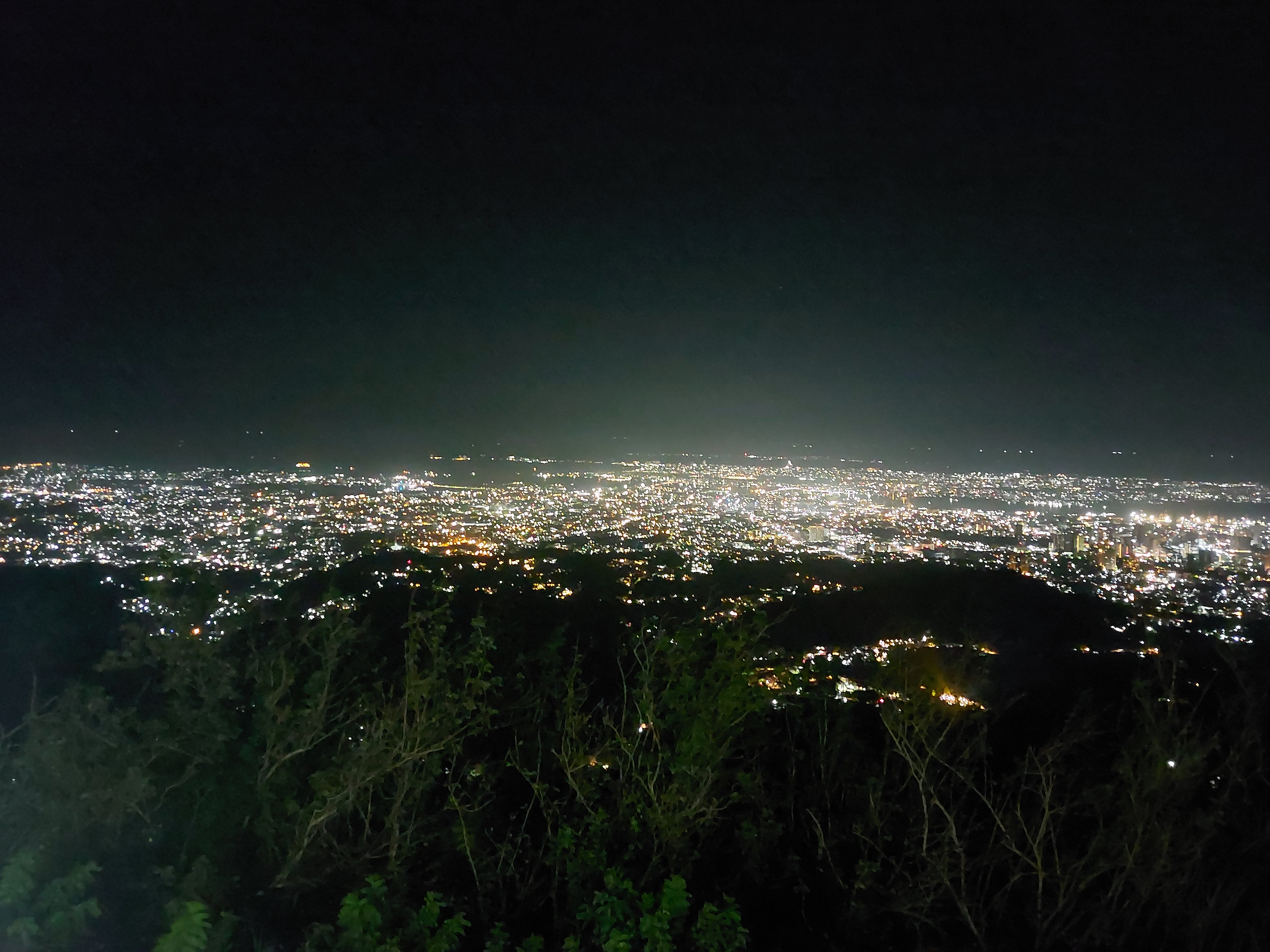
Aerial view of Cebu City

The Metropolitan Cebu Development and Coordinating Board (MCDCB) is the successor of the Metropolitan Cebu Development Council (MCDC) which was created by the RDC through Resolution No.117 (1997) and was subsequently replaced by the former in June 2011. Like its predecessor, it was mainly patterned after the Metropolitan Manila Development Authority with the inclusion of regional offices of the National Government agencies, regional services and utility agencies, and private institutions. It is mandated to formulate development plans, prepare programs and projects, and coordinate/monitor the implementation of programs and projects that address problems and concerns affecting Metro Cebu.

The MCDCB is composed of the provincial governor of Cebu; the mayors of the cities of Cebu, Mandaue, Lapu-Lapu, Talisay, Carcar, Danao, and Naga; the mayors of the municipalities of Compostela, Liloan, Consolacion, Cordova, Minglanilla, and San Fernando; the regional directors or heads of the Department of Public Works and Highways, Philippine National Police, Department of Environment and Natural Resources, Environmental Management Bureau of DENR, Philippine Navy, Philippine Coast Guard, Maritime Police, Traffic Management Group, Land Transportation Office, Department of Health, and Department of the Interior and Local Government, Philippine Information Agency, Metro Cebu Water District, National Youth Commission, Housing and Land Use Regulatory Board, Mactan–Cebu International Airport Authority, and Cebu Port Authority; and private groups such as the Ramon Aboitiz Foundation Incorporated, Cebu Business Club, Cebu Leads Foundation, Cebu Chamber of Commerce & Industry, Mandaue Chamber of Commerce & Industry, Filipino-Chinese Chamber of Commerce, and IBM Philippines. The governor of Cebu acts as chairman of the Board.

MCDCB does not have legal and institutional powers and resources like the Metropolitan Manila Development Authority (MMDA). The MCDCB defines the coverage of Metro Cebu for planning purposes only. The Province of Cebu has proposed a bill to create a permanent Metropolitan Cebu Development Authority (MCDA). This bill is still pending in both the House of Representatives and Senate in the Congress of the Philippines.

== See also ==
- Greater Manila Area
- Mega Manila
- Metro Manila
- Metro Davao
- Metro Iloilo-Guimaras
- Metro Clark

== Sources ==
- Scholze, O.; Hillmer, G.; Schneider, W. (2002). Protection of the groundwater resources of metropolis Cebu (Philippines) in consideration of saline intrusion into the coastal aquifer (PDF). 17th Salt Water Intrusion Meeting. Delft, Netherlands. pp. 489–495. Archived (PDF) from the original on April 25, 2016.
- Peñaranda, Victor (1998). "Bohol Frets while Cebu Thirsts". Philippine Center for Investigative Journalism. Archived from the original on February 22, 2001.
- Sun Star Cebu, CYR (October 8, 2005). "RDC enlarges Metro Cebu". Archived from the original on March 11, 2007.
