= Cebu Exchange =

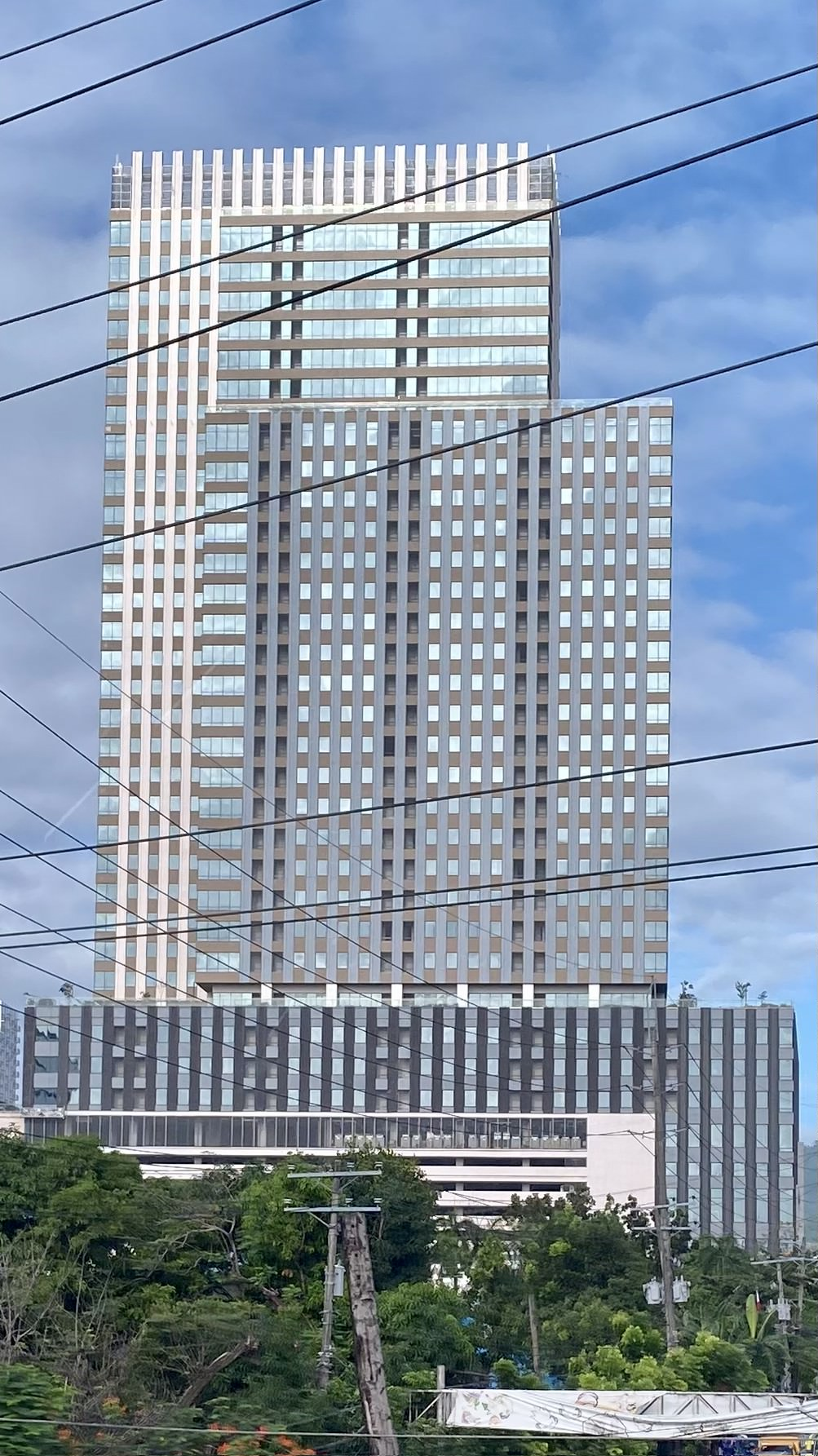
- Interactive map of the Cebu Exchange area

General information
- Status: Completed
- Type: Commercial
- Architectural style: Postmodern
- Location: Cebu City, Philippines
- Coordinates: 10.3273223°N 123.9049180°E
- Construction started: 2018; 8 years ago
- Topped-out: 2020; 6 years ago
- Completed: 2022; 4 years ago
- Cost: ₱8 billion

Height
- Height: 164 m (538 ft)

Technical details
- Floor count: 38
- Floor area: 108,490 m^{2} (1,167,800 sq ft)
- Lifts/elevators: 24
- Grounds: 8,440 m^{2} (90,800 sq ft)

Design and construction
- Architecture firm: GF & Partners Architects
- Developer: Cebu Lavana Land
- Structural engineer: Sy^2 + Associates
- Main contractor: DDT Konstrakt

Other information
- Number of units: 332
- Parking: 1,005 slots
- Public transit: 04L Lahug; 17B 17C 17D Apas

The Cebu Exchange is an office skyscraper in Cebu City, Philippines. With the height of 164 m (538 ft), it is the tallest office building in Metro Cebu. It is also the largest single-building office development in the Philippines, with Cebu Exchange hosting a gross floor area of 108,490 m^{2} (1,167,800 sq ft).

== Construction ==
In 2015, property developer Arthaland acquired the 8,440 m^{2} (90,800 sq ft) lot where the building would stand, located along Salinas Drive near Cebu IT Park, and construction started in 2018. Topped-out in 2020, it was completed in 2022. It is meant to host offices of businesses involved in the information technology and business process outsourcing industries.

== Certification ==
Designed as a green building, the Cebu Exchange has received various certifications including the EDGE Zero Carbon certification in 2018, as well as the LEED Platinum and BERDE 5-star certifications. It was the first building in the world to receive a EDGE Zero Carbon certification.

== Tenants ==
Notable tenants include the Cebu City Government on a lease agreement signed on March 2, 2026. The project, formally known as the Cebu City 24/7 Government Services, and dubbed "Mayor of the Night" by its proponents and media, is located at the 2nd floor of the building and began operations on April 6, 2026. It currently hosts a range of services from local city services, to national services such as the Pag-IBIG Fund. Other notable tenants include the BPO company Concentrix which has an office located in the 18th floor of the building, and is their largest office in Cebu to date.
