= Masters Tower Cebu =

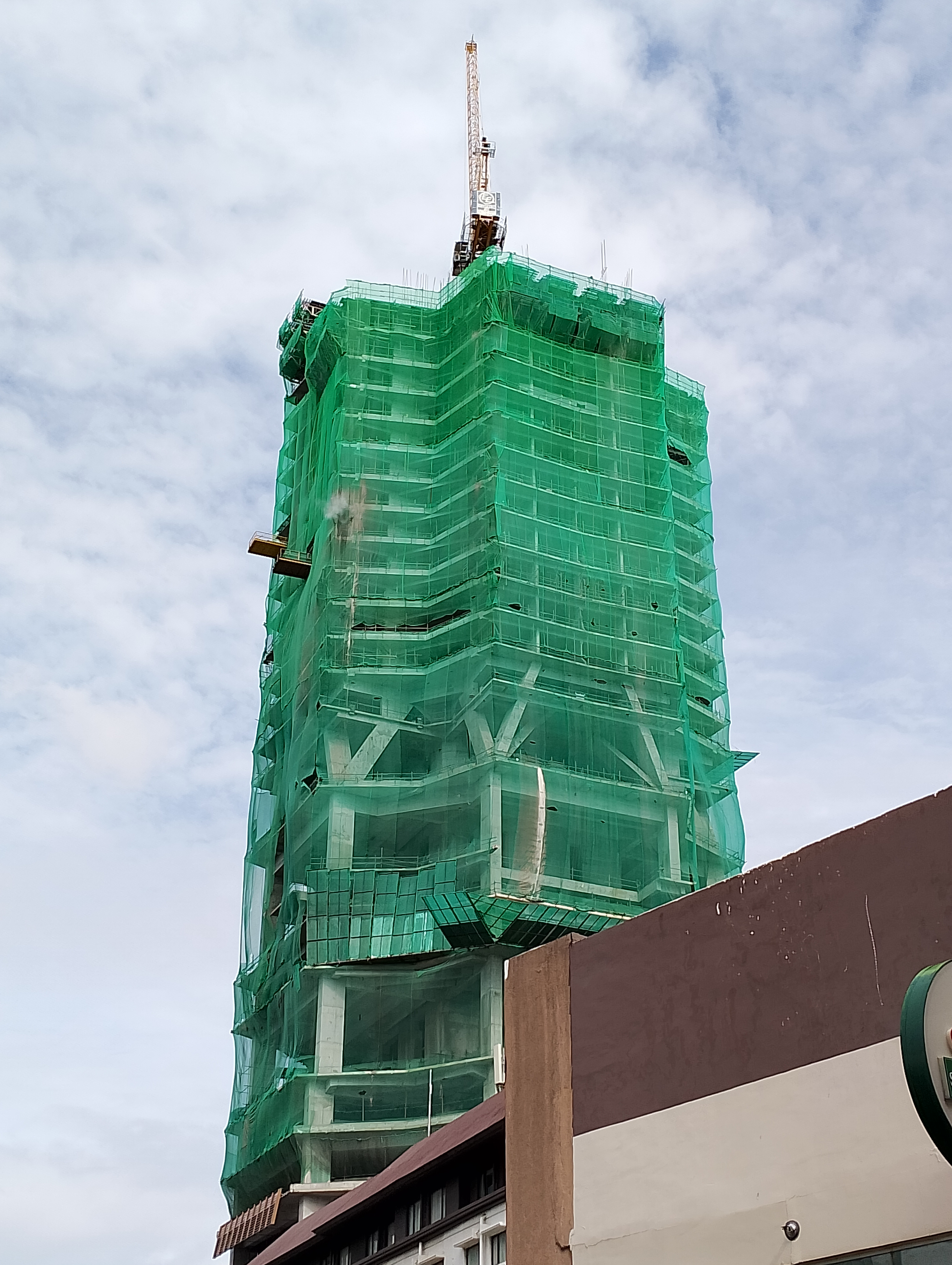
- Masters Tower Cebu as of 2024
- Hotel chain: Sofitel

General information
- Status: Topped off
- Location: Cebu City, Philippines
- Construction started: 2021
- Topped-out: 2025
- Cost: ₱4.5 billion

Height
- Height: 172 m (564 ft)

Technical details
- Floor count: 31
- Grounds: 2,840 m^{2} (30,600 sq ft)

Design and construction
- Architecture firm: Skidmore, Owings and Merrill; GF Partners and Architects
- Developer: Cebu Landmasters

Other information
- Number of rooms: 195

Masters Tower Cebu is a mixed-use skyscraper in Cebu City, Philippines. It will host the 195-room hotel Sofitel Cebu City.

== History ==
Construction of the Masters Tower Cebu was proposed as early as December 2019, when local developer Cebu Landmasters Inc. made a disclosure in the Philippine Stock Exchange that they plan to build an office-hotel building at the Cebu Business Park.

In February 2021, Cebu Landmasters launched the Masters Tower Cebu project.

On September 14, 2021, the groundbreaking for the Masters Tower Cebu took place. It topped off by March 2025.

== Architecture and design ==
The Masters Tower Cebu is designed by United States-based Skidmore, Owings and Merrill along with local firm GF Partners and Architects.

The building was erected on a 2,840 m^{2} (30,600 sq ft) lot at the Cebu Business Park. The building has a structural height of 172 m (564 ft).

== Tenants ==
The 195-room hotel, Sofitel Cebu City will be the main tenant of the Masters Tower Cebu. The building will also host office and retail spaces.The hotel will open in 2026.
