= Asian College of Technology =

Private college in Cebu, Philippines

- Former name: Asian Computer Institute (ACI)
- Motto: Sapientia Est Potestas
- Motto in English: Wisdom is Power
- Type: Private
- Established: 1988
- Founder: Rodrigo A. Abellanosa
- President: BG Rodrigo L. Abellanosa
- Faculty: 800
- Undergraduates: 6,700
- Postgraduates: 2,400
- Location: Cebu City and Talisay City, Cebu, Philippines; 10°17′55″N 123°53′45″E
- Campus: ACT - Cebu City Cyber Tower Campus (1 and 2); ACT - South Campus; ACT - North Campus
- Website: www.act.edu.ph

- Location in the Visayas Location in the Philippines

Asian College of Technology, officially the Asian College of Technology - International Educational Foundation (ACT-IEF or simply ACT), is a private college in the Philippines, located in Cebu City and Talisay City, in the Cebu province.

ACT has campuses located in Metro Cebu: ACT CyberTower Campus, the main campus at the corner of Leon Kilat and P. del Rosario Streets; ACT North Campus, at Pit-os, Talamban; and ACT South Campus, located in Cebu South Road, Bulacao, Talisay City.

The founder of ACT is Rodrigo Abellanosa, a Cebu City Congressman.

== History ==
ACT was established on September 19, 1988 as Asian Computer Institute (ACI) in the busy street of historic Colon at the heart of the booming Cebu City. Under the unrelenting leadership of its hands-on founder Rodrigo A. Abellanosa, the Institute blazed its way to become the primary provider of computer literacy of the corporate workforce in Cebu and nearby provinces which at the time were only starting to embrace the use of computer technology in the offices.

The school was incorporated on May 14, 1992 as Asian College of Technology, Inc., paving the way for the offering of post-secondary and collegiate courses that pioneered on hands-on oriented computer science curriculum.

ACT expanded its educational programs to southern Cebu in 1992 with the establishment of ACT - South Campus in then-municipality of Talisay. At present, the campus hosts the Senior High School and the Integrated School—ACT's basic education department—composed of preschool to junior high school.

The ACT Integrated School (ACT-IS) was established in 1996 to integrate the preschool (playgroup, nursery, and kindergarten), grade school and high school curricula.

In 2006, the Asian College of Technology - International Educational Foundation (ACT-IEF) was incorporated for the establishment of additional colleges and diversification of curricular offerings.

In 2007, ACT-IEF reached greater heights with the construction of a half-billion-peso, 15-storey building aptly called the ACT Cyber Tower. Powered by the technology of the future, the newer ACT Cebu City Campus is the most modern educational infrastructure at the hub of Cebu City.

In 2009, ACT established the CISCO Network Academy with De La Salle University as its regional academy head. A specialized CISCO Laboratory was put in place and the standard CISCO training program was incorporated in the curricula of Information Technology and Computer Science programs. In 2010, the Innobento Animation and Game Development Laboratory was established in partnership with UA Asia, a Japanese company, to train teachers and students advanced animation and game development techniques. In March 2011, ACT concluded a MOA with Nexus–Net Fiber Optics Incorporated to Jointly Establish the Fiber Optics Training Center for FOA Certification (FOTC-FOA).

ACT’s mission of developing highly competent and globally competitive individuals has been validated by being awarded by the National Council for Product and Service Quality as the Best Computer School-Metro Cebu in 2005, 2006, 2007, 2008; the Best Computer School-Visayas in 2009 and the Best Computer School-National Level in 2010.

In May 2014, the Federation of Accrediting Agencies of the Philippines (FAAP) granted ACT a candidate status for its elementary, high school, and nursing programs, and in January 2015 for its hospitality management (HM) and information technology (IT) programs, for satisfactorily meeting the standards and fulfilling all the requirements of the Philippine Association of Colleges and Universities Commission on Accreditation (PACUCOA).

The Department of Education (DepEd) granted ACT's main and south campuses' permits to offer Senior High School program beginning school year 2016-17. Tracks offered included Academic, TVL, and Arts and Design. Offered under the Academic Tracks are the following strands: Accountancy, Business and Management (ABM), Science, Technology, Engineering and Mathematics (STEM), Humanities and Social Sciences (HUMMS), and General Academic Strand (GAS). Offered under the Tech-Voc Track is the Information and Communications Technology (ICT) Strand with majors in Animation, Computer Programming, Technical Drafting and Home Economics.

In October 2017, FAAP granted ACT Level 1 Accredited Status to the Elementary, High School, Hospitality Management, and Information Technology programs for having satisfactorily met the standards and fulfilled all the requirements of the PACUCOA

From its inception as a purely computer school, ACT has diversified its curricular offerings to include BS in Computer Science, BS in Information Technology, BS in Information Systems, BS in Computer Engineering, BS in Hospitality Management, BS in Tourism Management, BS in Business Administration, BS in Nursing, Bachelor of Secondary Education, Bachelor of Elementary Education, Associate in Computer Technology, Computer Technician Course, Diploma in Practical Nursing, Certificate in Caregiving, and complete Basic Education Programs.

== Academics ==
=== Undergraduate programs ===
- College of Arts, Sciences and Pedagogy
  - Bachelor of Secondary Education Major in English
  - Bachelor of Secondary Education Major in Mathematics
  - Bachelor of Elementary Education Major in Preschool Education
  - Bachelor of Elementary Education Major in General Education
- College of Business Management
  - Bachelor of Science in Tourism Management
  - Bachelor of Science in Hospitality Management
  - Associate in Hospitality Management
  - Bachelor of Science in Business Administration
- College of Computer Studies
  - Bachelor of Science in Information Technology (Specializations in Network Technology, Animation & Game Development, Mobile Applications, Databases & Applications, Software Engineering, Web Technology, Media Design & Graphics)
  - Bachelor of Science in Computer Science
  - Bachelor of Science in Information System
  - Associate in Computer Technology
- College of Nursing and Allied Programs
  - Bachelor of Science in Nursing
  - Diploma in Practical Nursing
  - Diploma in Caregiving

=== Senior High School Tracks ===
Academic Track

This course is taken by junior high students who plan to pursue college after graduating in Senior High.

- GAS (General Academic Strand) - A preparatory course for diverse college programs.
- HUMSS (Humanities and Social Sciences Strand) - Leading to college programs in Philosophy and Education.
- STEMS (Science, Technology, Engineering and Mathematics Strand) - Leading to college programs in Science, Information Technology, and Engineering.
- ABMS (Accountancy, Business and Management Strand) - Leading to college programs in Accountancy and Business Management.

TVL Track(Technical-Vocational-Livelihood Track)

This track is taken by junior high students who aim for employment or entrepreneurship after graduating in Senior High. They can still pursue college education but will not be credited in some minor subjects.

- HE (Home Economics)
  - Bread and Pastry & Food and Beverage Services - Grade 11 students will be able to take TESDA NC II for Bread & Pastry and TESDA NC II Food and Beverage upon completion of the strands.
  - Housekeeping & Tour Guiding - Grade 12 students will be able to take TESDA NC II Housekeeping and TESDA NC II Tour Guiding after completion of the strands.
  - Caregiving - Students will be able to take TESDA NC II Caregiving after completion of the strand.
- ICT (Information Communication Technology)
  - Hardware Servicing & Programming - Students will be able to take TESDA NC II Hardware Servicing and TESDA NC II Programming after completion of the strands.
  - Technical Drafting & Animation - Students will be able to take TESDA NC II Technical Drafting and TESDA NC II Animation after completion of the strands.

Arts and Design Track

This track is taken by Junior High students who possess and exhibit artistic inclination in the different fields in Arts.

- APS (Arts Production Strand) - This strand focuses in the development and enhancement of skills needed in the fields of Advertisement and Literary Arts.
- PAS (Performing Arts Strand) - This strand cultivates the passion of the child in the field of Performing Arts.
