= Mandani Bay =

Mixed-use development in Mandaue, Philippines

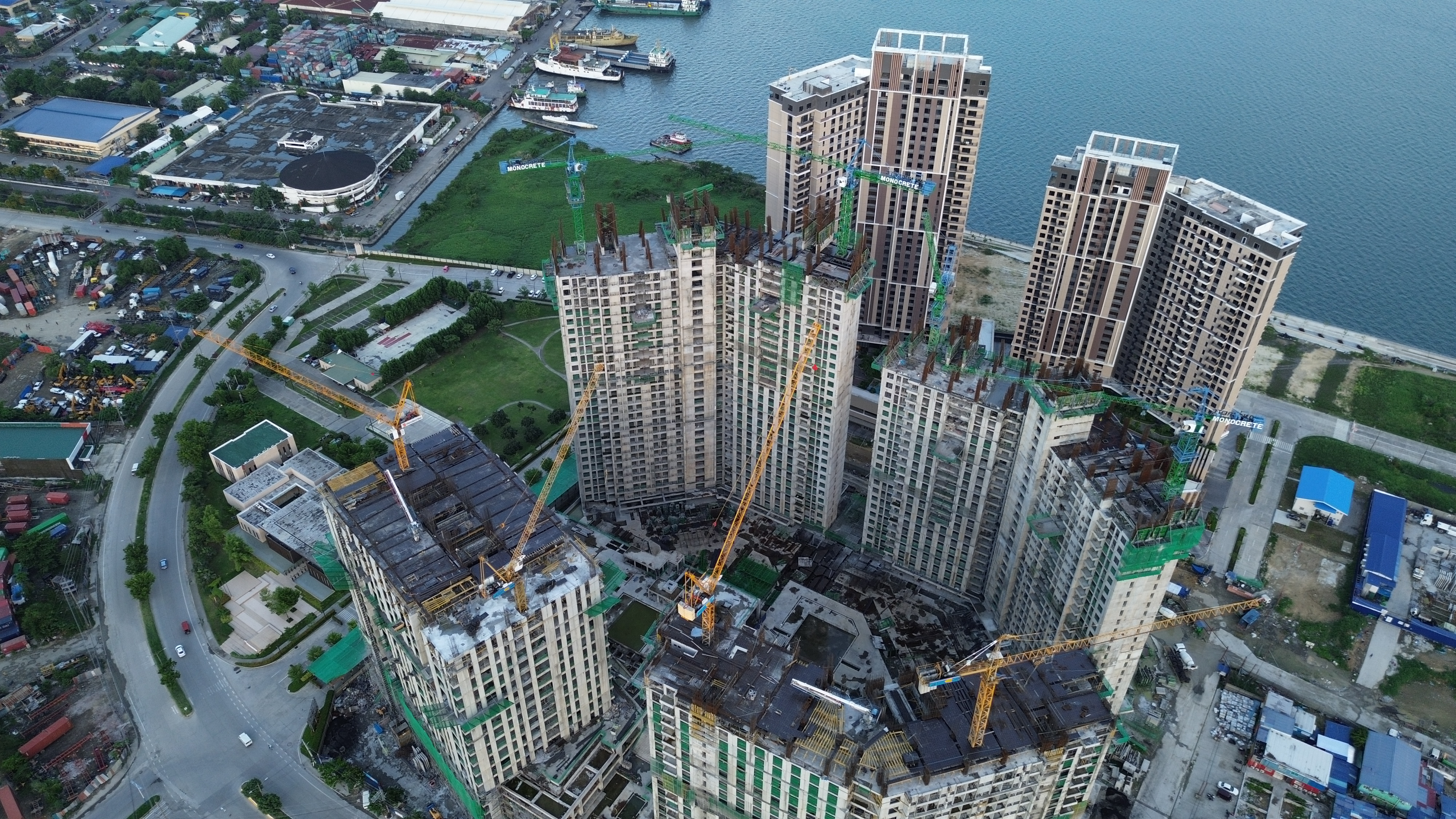
- Mandani Bay in 2023

Project
- Opening date: 2020 (Phase 1)
- Developer: HTLand, Inc.
- Owner: HTLand, Inc.
- Website: mandanibay.com

Location
- Interactive map of Mandani Bay
- Coordinates: 10°19′14″N 123°56′12″E
- Location: North Reclamation Area, Mandaue City, Cebu, Philippines

Mandani Bay is a waterfront, 20 ha (49 acres) mixed-use development currently under construction on North Reclamation Area, Mandaue, Philippines. This project is developed by HTLand Inc., a joint venture by Hong Kong–based Hong Kong Land and Cebu-based Taft Properties, the real estate arm of Vicsal Development Corporation, which also owns the Metro Retail Stores Group.

== History ==
In June 2015, Hong Kong Land and Taft Properties formally announced their intentions on developing a 20-hectare waterfront development, to be called "Mandani Bay", "Mandani" coming from Mandaue City's pre-colonial name, and "Bay" from its waterfront location. Though the project was announced in the middle of 2015, ground works started as early as February 2014, when the property location was fenced. The entire property is expected to be finished within "10 to 15 years" from 2016, when the first development within the property, the Mandani Bay Suites, was launched.

=== Construction ===
Groundwork for the development began in February 2014, when the property location was fenced. The first development within the property, the Mandani Bay Suites, was launched in 2016. The Mandani Bay Suites were topped off in 2018, with the turnover for its units starting in 2019. This was followed by the Mandani Bay Quay, another residential complex, and One Mandani Bay, the development's first office tower. Both developments were topped off on January 15, 2024.

== Developments ==
=== Mandani Bay Suites ===
Mandani Bay Suites is a two-tower residential complex. It is the development's first residential enclave, having a total of 1,226 units. The complex has a 5-star BERDE rating, the first in the Visayas and Mindanao (VisMin) region. It features studio to three-bedroom units and a number of individually designed special units including townhouses, lofts, penthouses, and garden units.

=== Mandani Bay Quay ===
Mandani Bay Quay (pronounced /kee/, like “key”) is a four-tower mixed-use complex. Three towers make up the development's second residential enclave, having a total of 3,225 units. It features studio to three-bedroom units, classified under Standard and Premium units.

==== One Mandani Bay ====
The fourth tower is known as One Mandani Bay, a 30-storey office tower. The tower is the first office development in the complex and is the recipient of the 2021 Property Guru Philippine Property Awards for Best Office Architectural Design. It has a floorplate of 2,382 square meters (25,639.63 square feet), and offers 196 office units.

=== Lifestyle Spaces ===
Mandani Bay hosts several lifestyle spaces, such as the Boardwalk, Mandani Bay Park, and the Tent.

== See also ==
- Cebu Business Park
- Cebu IT Park
- South Road Properties
- The Mactan Newtown
