= South Road Properties =

Central business district in Cebu City, Philippines

- Central Business District
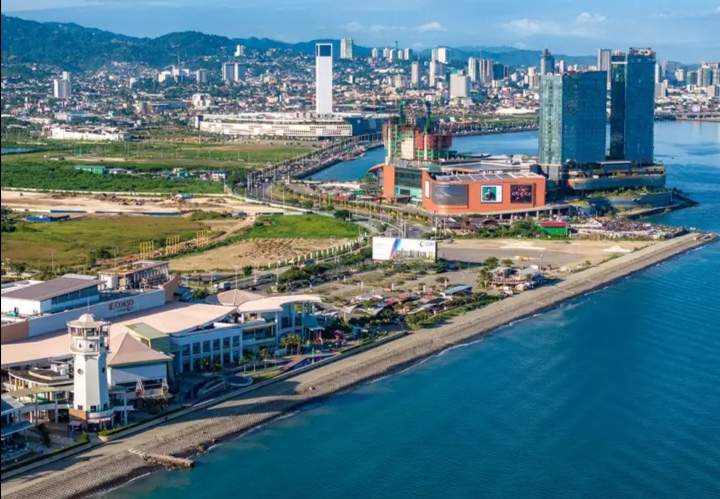
- Skyline featuring SM Seaside, Nustar Resort Cebu, and IL Corso Mall
- Nicknames: SRP; Cebu Coastal Area; Cebu's Frontier
- Location of SRP within Metro Cebu
- Coordinates: 10°16′32.4″N 123°52′39.2″E
- Country: Philippines
- Region: Central Visayas
- Metropolitan Area: Metro Cebu
- City: Cebu City
- Barangays: Mambaling; Inayawan
- Established: 2005

Area
  - Total: 3 km^{2} (1.2 sq mi)
- Elevation: 3 m (9.8 ft)
- Highest elevation: 6 m (20 ft)

Population (2015)
  - Total: 216
  - Density: 72/km^{2} (190/sq mi)
- Time zone: UTC+8 (PST)
- Area code: 2

The South Road Properties (SRP), also known as the South Reclamation Project, is a 300 ha (740 acres) reclamation area in Cebu City, Philippines. The area, which is reclaimed from Mactan Channel, is located off the coast of the southern district of Cebu City, near Barangays Mambaling, Inayawan, and Pasil. It spans from the shore of mainland Cebu to Kawit Point (formerly Kawit Island). An island-type reclaimed area, it is connected with mainland Cebu by the Cebu South Coastal Road (from which the area's name is derived from) and the Mambaling Access Road (officially the F. Vestil Street). Through the Cebu–Cordova Link Expressway, the SRP is also connected by land to Cordova and the island of Mactan.

== History ==
In the late 1980s, then-Cebu City mayor Tomas Osmeña proposed reclaiming land from Mactan Channel, particularly the sea between mainland Cebu City and Kawit Island (a former quarantine facility during the American rule). In 1991, the project was approved as part of the Metro Cebu Development Project, a study financed by the Japanese Official Development Assistance fund. It was originally envisioned to house light industries but eventually evolved into a mixed-used development. The project started civil works in 1997, and was financed by a ¥12.315 billion (equivalent to about ₱5 billion in 2022) loan provided by the Japan Bank for International Cooperation. Works finished in 2004.

== Developments ==
=== City di Mare ===
City di Mare (formerly "Citta de Mare", roughly translates into "city by the sea" in Italian) is a mixed-used development in SRP, owned and developed by Filinvest. The whole area takes up a total of 48 hectares (120 acres), the largest development in SRP by land area. The whole development is expected to consist of mid-to-high-rise residential buildings, office buildings, and a mall by the sea, named Il Corso (means "The Course" in Italian).

=== Nustar Resort Cebu ===
Nustar Resort Cebu, formerly known as Isla dela Victoria (Spanish for Victory's Island), is a resort and casino facility located on the site of the former Kawit Island (now Kawit Point). The development has a total land area of 8 hectares (20 acres). The project, which is expected to include restaurants, bars, a mall, convention center, casino, park, theater, and at least three hotels, is a joint venture of the Cebu City government and Universal Hotels and Resorts Inc., a subsidiary of JG Summit Holdings. Some parts of the project, including the casino, had a soft opening in May 2022.

=== SM Seaside ===
SM Seaside

SRP's most popular development is the SM Seaside complex. The whole development takes up a total of 30 hectares (74 acres). The complex features the SM Seaside mall (the second biggest shopping mall in Cebu, after SM City Cebu), a 147 m (482 ft) observation tower, a marine theme park, and a chapel. The complex is also expected to include a school, a hospital, office buildings, and condominiums. The whole development is expected to cost ₱30 billion.

=== South Coast City ===
Standing on the old San Pedro Calungsod Template Grounds, where the final mass of the 2016 International Eucharistic Congress was held, is South Coast City. A 26 hectares (64 acres) mixed-used project developed by SM Prime and Ayala Land, it launched in 2020, and will include mixed-used commercial blocks, an arena, a convention center, a 1.1 hectares (2.7 acres) central park, residential buildings, and office buildings, among others.

== Infrastructure ==
=== Current infrastructure ===
==== Cebu South Coastal Road ====
The whole reclamation area is served by a two-way, six-lane divided road called the Cebu South Coastal Road (CSCR) which is a national road. The CSCR, which traverses the whole of SRP and connects Talisay to downtown Cebu City, also serves as an alternative road to the congested Natalio Bacalso Avenue. A large part of the boulevard has the Cebu Strait on its eastern side and a large array of developments on its western side. The reclamation area is connected to downtown Cebu City through the Cebu City South Coastal Road Viaduct along the Cebu South Coastal Road. The entire road forms part of National Route 840 (N840) for the Philippine highway network.

==== F. Vestil Street ====
The F. Vestil Street is a 1.2 km (0.75 mi) long, four-lane road which connects the SRP with Barangay Mambaling in mainland Cebu City. The road starts from the intersection with Natalio Bacalso Avenue under the Mambaling Flyover, which shortly leads up to an intersection with L. Gabuya Street and C. Padilla Street before terminating at the Cebu South Coastal Road. The road, which was previously unnamed, was and is also informally known as the Mambaling Access Road. On January 15, 2015, the road was formally named as F. Vestil Street, in honor of Francisco Vestil, a Mambaling native who was the flagbearer for the Philippines at the 1948 Summer Olympics and was a member of the Philippine basketball team that competed then.

==== Cebu–Cordova Link Expressway ====
The Cebu–Cordova Link Expressway (CCLEX) connects the municipality of Cordova on Mactan Island and Cebu City through the Cebu South Coastal Road. The CCLEX is the third bridge linking mainland Cebu and Mactan Island. It is the first toll expressway in the Philippines outside Luzon and, at 8.9 kilometres (5.5 mi) long, is also the longest sea-crossing bridge in the Philippines, surpassing the San Juanico Bridge. It opened in April 2022.

==== South Road Properties Tunnel ====
The SRP Tunnel is a two-way, four-lane 0.97 kilometres (0.60 mi) dual carriageway, and is the first road tunnel in the Philippines. It began construction in 2006 and was inaugurated in 2010. Much like the SRP, it was financed by a loan from the Japan Bank for International Cooperation. The tunnel goes under Plaza Independencia and Fort San Pedro and connects the SRP to the North Reclamation Area through the Sergio "Serging" Osmeña Jr. Boulevard. It is a joint construction of the Cebu City and Japan governments. As of August 2024, CCTO and ZLREJ Trading and Construction reported that the southbound lane's light source repair is almost finished and the tunnel rehabilitation is expected to be completed before the Sinulog 2025.

=== Proposed infrastructure ===
As the largest remaining developable plot of land in Cebu City, the South Road Properties is being primed for future growth. With this, several infrastructure projects are also set in place to help facilitate this projected growth.

==== Cebu Bus Rapid Transit System ====
The Cebu Bus Rapid Transit System is a planned mass transit system for Cebu City. Once completed, it is expected to serve the SRP, and allows for a connection all the way to the Cebu IT Park. The Cebu BRT is also expected to become the first operational bus rapid transit project in the Philippines upon completion.

==== South Road Properties Roundabout ====
The SRP Roundabout or the SRP Rotunda is a proposed four-lane rotunda. It is to be located at the junction of the Cebu South Coastal Road and F. Vestil Street. The proposal of the project was approved by the Cebu City council on August 18, 2021. The rotunda project was proposed as to ease the traffic situation in the area and for a shorter route for motorists bound for Mambaling, instead of taking a U-Turn slot under the SRP viaduct. Construction was expected to be completed by 2023, but as of 2024, there is currently no progress.

== See also ==
- Cebu Business Park
- Cebu IT Park
- Mandani Bay
