= Crown Regency Hotel and Towers =

Skyscraper hotels in the Philippines

- The complex in 2022
- Interactive map of the Crown Regency Hotel and Towers area

General information
- Status: Completed
- Type: Hotel
- Location: Osmeña Boulevard, Cebu City, Philippines
- Opening: December 2005
- Owner: J. King & Sons Company, Inc.
- Operator: Crownlifestyle.Net, Inc.

Height
- Antenna spire: 165 m (541.34 ft)
- Roof: 150 m (492.13 ft)

Technical details
- Floor count: 45 above ground, 1 underground

Design and construction
- Architects: T.I. Vasquez Architects & Planners Inc. (TVA&P Inc.)
- Developer: J. King & Sons Company, Inc.
- Structural engineer: M.A. Coronel Engineering Consultancy (MACEC)
- Main contractor: ASEC Development & Construction Corporation

The Crown Regency Hotel and Towers is a large hotel complex located near Osmeña Boulevard, Cebu City, Philippines. It was constructed around 2005, and officially opened to the public in 2008, with a subsequent renovation sometime after it opened.

The main building, the 45-storey Fuente Tower 1, is one of the tallest hotel buildings in the country, at about 160 meters (520 feet) in height. It used to be the tallest building in Cebu City before being eclipsed by Horizons 101 Tower 1, which stands at 178 metres (584 feet) in height, in 2015.

The 38th floor of the main tower features an amusement facility with a flat roller coaster utilizing a tilting vehicle that runs around the edge of the building, as well as an activity similar to the CN Tower EdgeWalk. Two high-speed scenic elevators (as well as two high-speed elevators opposite them with traditional enclosed cabs) grant guests access to both the building's 18th floor (Sky Lobby), and the 38th floor, which provide a great view of the rest of uptown Cebu City.

== Architecture and design ==
Street-level view of Crown Regency Hotel and Towers

The Crown Regency Hotel and Towers was designed by local architectural firm T.I. Vasquez Architects & Planners Inc., while the structural design was made by M.A. Coronel Engineering Consultancy (MACEC)

Other members of the design team are CMA Engineering Consultants (Sanitary, Mechanical, and Fire Safety Works); lraido T. Legaspi, Jr. & Associates (Electrical Works); and E.O. Bataclan & Associates (Interior Design).

The General Contractor that built the tower was ASEC Development and Construction Corporation.

== Height increase ==
Sometime after completion, the upper floors were increased in height in order to add new rides and attractions to the Sky Extreme Adventures facilities. As a result, the building gained an 80 ft (24.38 m) increase in height.

== See also ==
- List of tallest buildings in the Philippines
