= Cebu Business Park =

Business park district in Cebu City, Philippines

- Central Business District
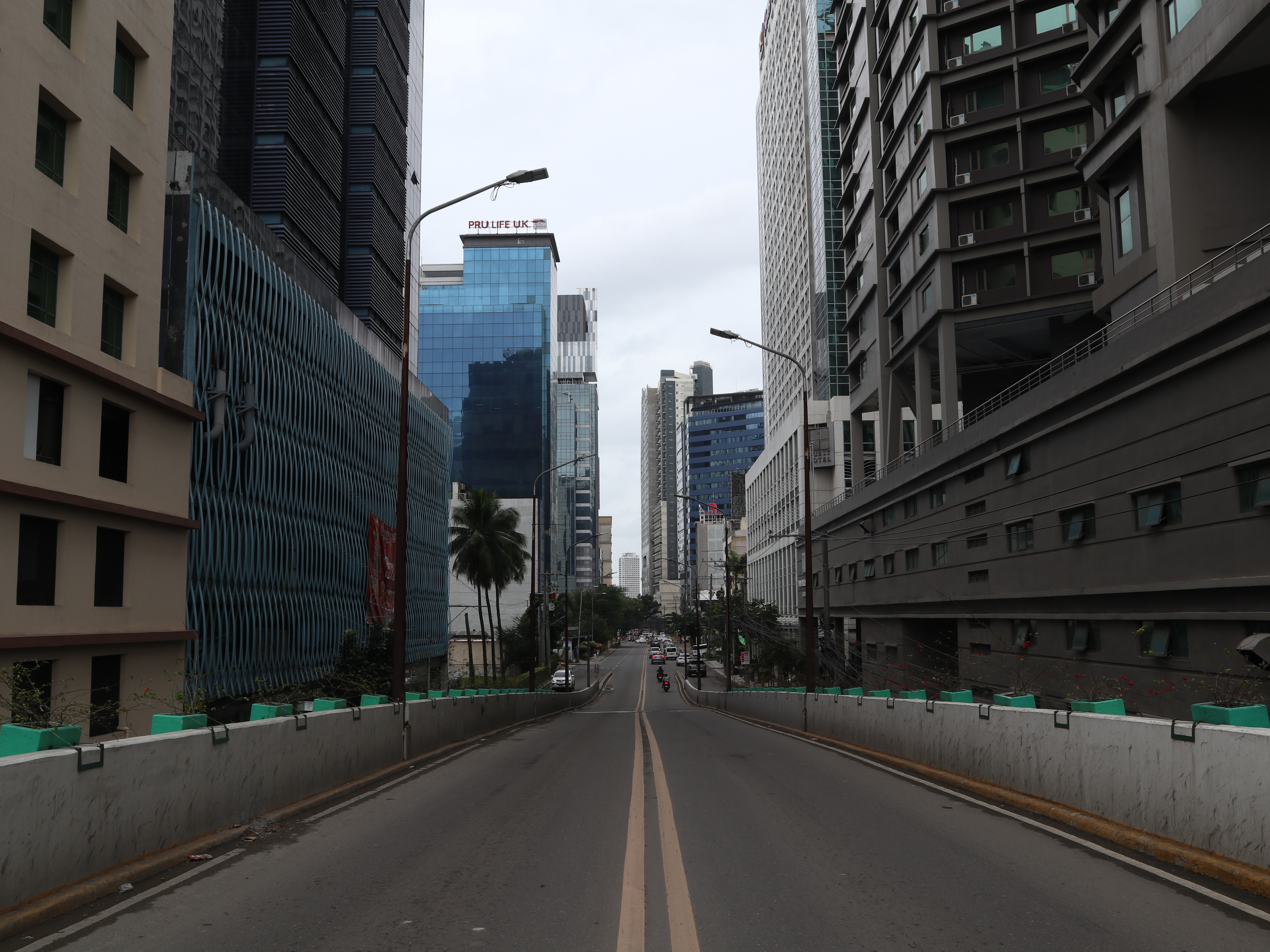
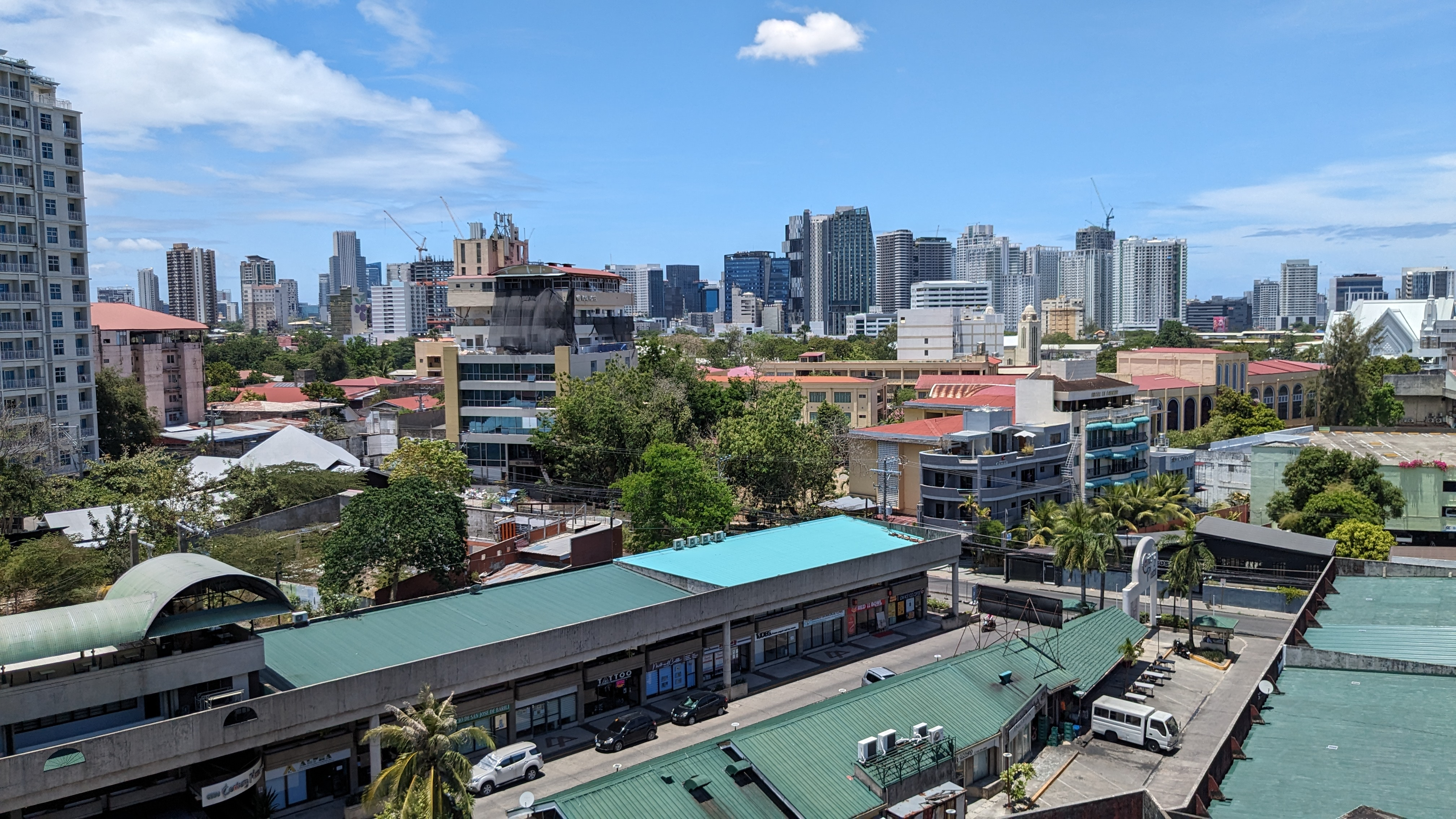
- Aerial view Archbishop Reyes Avenue Ayala Center Cebu View of the business park from Fuente Hotel de Cebu
- Interactive map of Cebu Business Park
- Cebu City
- Coordinates: 10°18′57″N 123°54′21″E
- Country: Philippines
- Region: Central Visayas
- Province: Cebu
- City: Cebu City
- Established: 1989

Area
  - Total: 0.50 km^{2} (0.19 sq mi)

Population (2015)
  - Total: 816
  - Density: 1,600/km^{2} (4,200/sq mi)
- Time zone: UTC+8 (PST)
- Website: Official website

Cebu Business Park (CBP) is a 50-hectare master-planned development in Cebu City, Philippines. Cebu Holdings, an affiliate of Ayala Land, is currently responsible for the development of Cebu Business Park. Integrating business, residential, sports, recreation and leisure facilities, the centerpiece of the business park is the 9-hectare Ayala Center Cebu shopping mall, which draws 60,000 shoppers daily.

== History ==
In the late 1980s, the Cebu provincial government headed by Governor Lito Osmeña sold its 45-hectare property used as the Club Filipino golf course to the Ayala Corporation. The Cebu Business Park was launched in 1989 with 100 commercial lots for sale, with Ayala Corporation, through its subsidiary, Cebu Holdings, retaining spaces for their own development. The development features for the Cebu Business Park were incorporated into the 1990 zoning ordinance of Cebu City. Land development work on the business park was completed in 1992. The very first building to rise in the park was the Cebu Holdings Center, an office condominium nine stories high, followed by Ayala Center Cebu in 1994, and a Marriott Hotel in 1997 (now a Seda Hotel).

== Businesses ==
As one of Cebu City's premier business and commercial districts, Cebu Business Park houses several companies ranging from business process outsourcing to industries. Among them are Innove Communications, Vivant Corporation, Johndorf Ventures Corporation, Taft Property, EY (SGV & Co. and EY GDS), PwC (Isla Lipana & Co.), Regus, Jinisys Software Inc., Above Infranet Solutions Inc., Taiheiyo Cement and Cathay Pacific. The business park is also home to local and foreign banking and financial institutions such as HSBC, Chinatrust Bank, BDO, Metrobank, LandBank, RCBC, Security Bank, PSBank, Chinabank, UnionBank and Asia United Bank.

== Residential ==
Cebu Business Park hosts residential areas such as Ayala Land developments mostly within the immediate vicinity of Ayala Center Cebu. Across the mall is Avalon Condo Cebu, a 21-story premium condominium complex. 1016 Residences, a 27-story condominium building, offers 109 exclusive two to three-bedroom units. There are also limited edition penthouse units with price ranging from ₱10 million to ₱45 million. The development features landscaped gardens, a kiddie play area, lobby lounge, roof deck and a sports facility. There is also Park Point Residences, a 38-story condominium building offering 255 one- and two-bedroom units to three-bedroom penthouse units. Alongside the two developments is the more recent The Alcoves, another luxury condominium spanning two residential blocks and scaling up to 37 stories featuring one- to three-unit bedrooms. Other developments include 21-story Sedona Parc and three-towered Solinea, residential projects by Alveo Land, and a subsidiary of Ayala Land.

== Gallery ==
Globe Innove IT Plaza

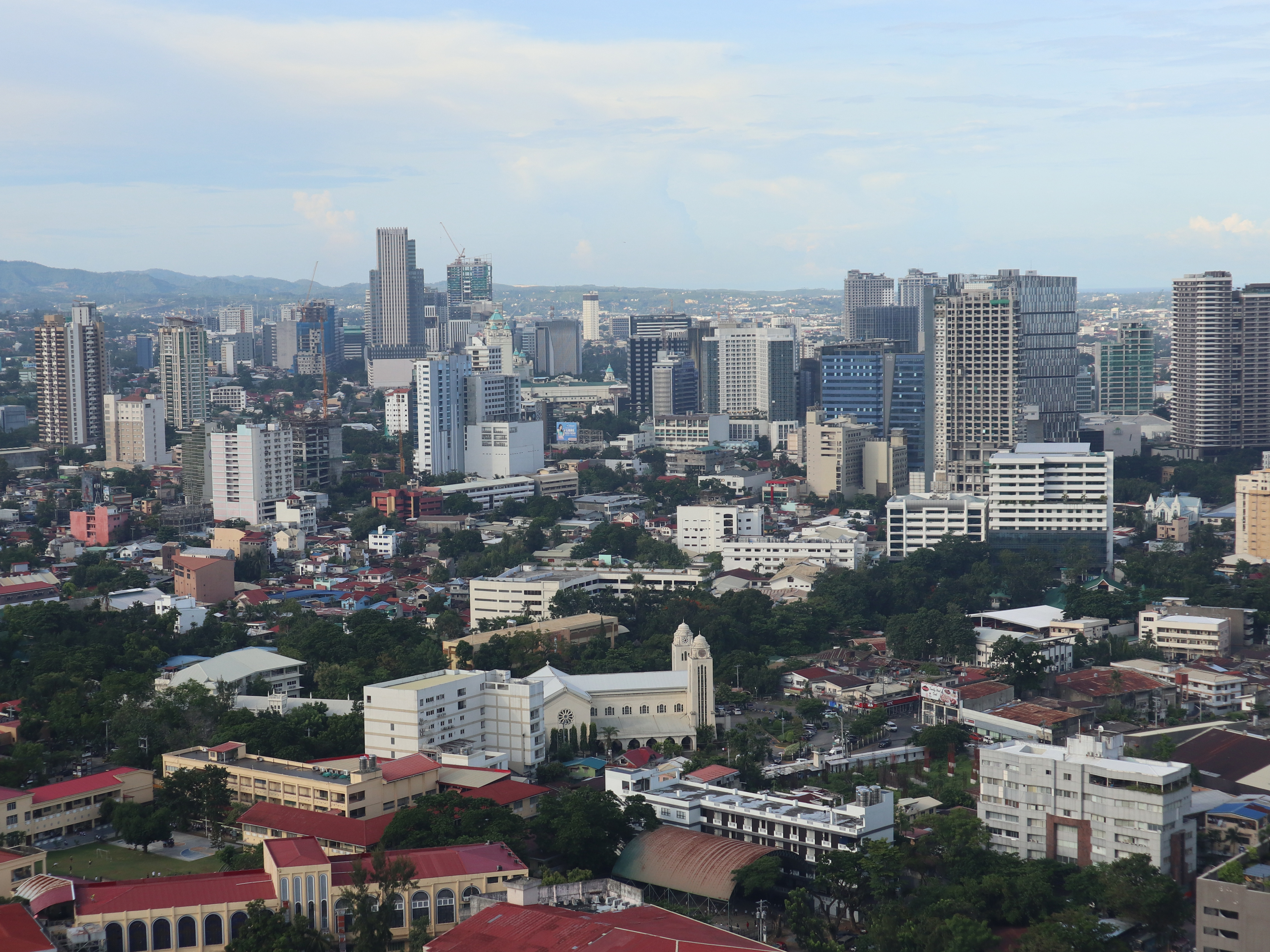
Skyline of Cebu Business Park in 2022

The Terraces at Ayala Center Cebu

== See also ==
- Cebu IT Park
- Cebu South Road Properties
