= Gilutongan Island =

Islet in the Philippines

Isla sa Gilutongan
- Location within Visayas

Geography
- Coordinates: 10°12′13″N 123°59′19″E
- Archipelago: Philippine
- Adjacent to: Cebu Strait
- Area: 0.13 km^{2} (0.050 sq mi)

Administration
- Philippines
- Region: Central Visayas
- Province: Cebu
- Municipality: Cordova
- Barangay: Gilutongan

Demographics
- Population: 1,851 (2024)
- Pop. density: 14,238/km^{2} (36876/sq mi)
- Ethnic groups: Cebuano

Gilutongan is one of the islands comprising the Olango Island Group, a group of islands in between Mactan and the Danajon Bank in the Philippines. Most of the Olango islands are part of Lapu-Lapu City, Gilutongan, however, is under the jurisdiction of the municipality of Cordova, Cebu. The island is approximately 5 km (3.1 mi) southeast from the town of Cordova. The population of Gilutongan is 1,851.

The island is one of the destinations of island-hopping tours because the island has white-sand beaches and a marine sanctuary, where tourists can do snorkeling and underwater diving activities.

The island is locally administered by Barangay Gilutongan. The nearby uninhabited Nalusuan Island is also part of the territory of the barangay. Gilutongan has one public school, Gilutongan Integrated School.

In December 2021, Typhoon Rai or Supertyphoon Odette has damaged 85% of the houses in Gilutongan and most of the residents' boats were wrecked. Relief assistance was provided to the affected families on the island by the local government, civil society organizations, and the Philippine Navy.

== See also ==
- List of beaches in the Philippines
- List of islands by population density
