= List of islands of Cebu =

This is a list of islands under the jurisdiction of Cebu in the Philippines.

Name of island or island group	Description
Cebu Island	Cebu is the main island of Cebu province in the Visayas. It lies to the east of Negros; to the east is Leyte and to the southeast is Bohol. It is flanked on its west side by the Tañon Strait (between Cebu and Negros) and on the east side by the Cebu Strait (between Cebu and Bohol). Cebu is located between 9°25'N and 11°15'N latitude and between 123°13'E and 124°5'E longitude in the center of the archipelago.
Bantayan Island: Bagayag; Banitugan (or Panitugan); Botong; Jilantagaan (or Jicantangan); Lutungan; Maambot; Mambacayao; Pintagan; Sagasay; Silagon; Silion (or Virgin Island); Yao Island	Bantayan Island is located west of the northern tip of Cebu Island. It is composed of three municipalities: Bantayan, Madridejos, and Santa Fe. The island can be reached by ferry from Hagnaya Wharf in San Remigio, Cebu, or from Cebu City(by air through the Mactan Cebu International Airport), or from Cadiz in Negros Occidental.
Bolinawan Islet	Located in the east coast of Barangay Bolinawan in Carcar
Calamangan	Located east of the northern tip of Cebu Island; part of Daanbantayan
Camotes: Pacijan Island; Ponson Island; Poro Island; Tulang Island	The Camotes Islands are a group of four islands that are located east of Cebu Island, southwest of Leyte, and north of Bohol, in the center of the Camotes Sea.
Capitancillo Islet	Part of Bogo
Carnaza Island: Maria Island	Carnaza Island is a 173.5-hectare (429-acre) turtle-shaped island located north of the mainland Cebu.
Chocolate Island	Part of Daanbantayan
Cordova	Cordova is an island lying very close and south of the island of Mactan. The island is often mistaken as part of Mactan and is occupied entirely by the town of Cordova.
Doong Islands: Botigues (or Batiquis); Doong; Lipayran	Located just south of Bantayan Island, all part of the municipality of Bantayan.
Gapas-gapas	South of and part of Cordova
Guintacan Island	Part of Santa Fe, west of the northern tip of Cebu Island at 11°19′30″N 123°53′30″E
Jibitnil (or Gihitngil) Island	Part of Medellin and directly lies west of Medellin Port. It has a direct distance of 1.8 kilometers from the tip of the port to the island.
Mactan	Mactan is an island located to the southeast of Cebu City with a 484 meter gap between the two islands taken from the nearest point of land on both islands. The island is the seat of the city of Lapu-Lapu. The island is connected to Cebu by the two bridges: the Marcelo Fernan Bridge and the Mactan-Mandaue Bridge.
Malapascua Island: Dakit-Dakit	Malapascua Island is a tiny island, only about 2.5 kilometers long and 1 km wide, located across a shallow strait from the northernmost tip of Cebu island. The island is covered by the insular barangay of Logon (part of the Daanbantayan municipality), with eight hamlets.
Olango: Camungi; Hilutungan; Kaohagan (or Caohagan); Nalusuan; Panganan; Sulpa	The Olango Island Group is a group of islands in the Cebu Strait, 5 km east of Mactan. Olango Island and its neighboring islets have a total land area of approximately 10.3 km^{2} (1,030 hectares). The island group is a major tourist destination in Cebu, known for its wildlife sanctuary.
Pescador Island	A small limestone island in the Tañon Strait, part of municipality of Moalboal. The island is known for its rich marine life.
Saragossa (or Zaragoza) Island	Saragossa Island is a resort island off the west coast of Cebu in the town Badian. It is also known as Badian Island.
Sumilon Island	Is a resort island which is part of Oslob.
