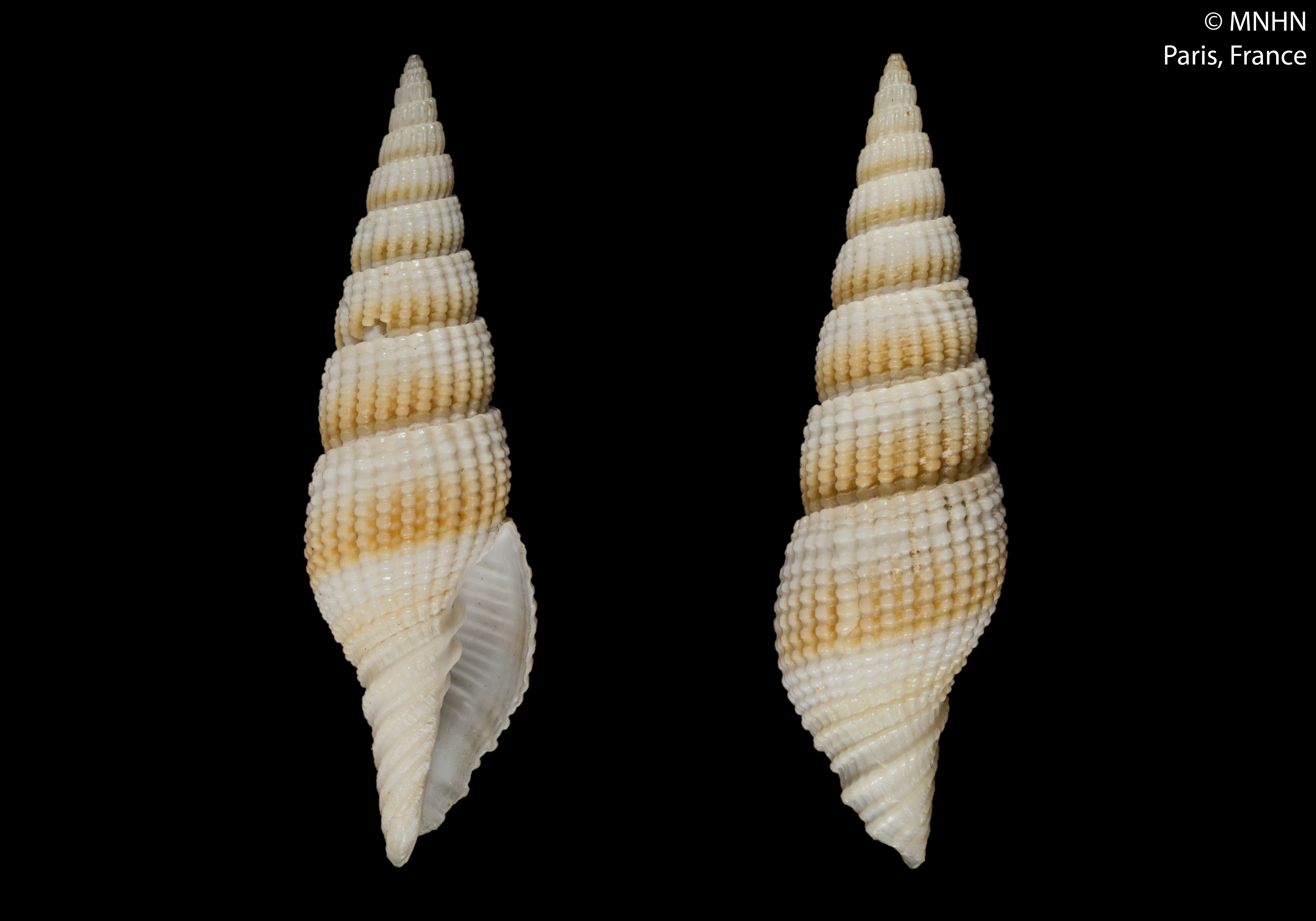
- Shell of Tosapusia sauternesensis (holotype at MNHN, Paris)

Scientific classification
- Kingdom: Animalia
- Phylum: Mollusca
- Class: Gastropoda
- Subclass: Caenogastropoda
- Order: Neogastropoda
- Superfamily: Turbinelloidea
- Family: Costellariidae
- Genus: Tosapusia
- Species: T. sauternesensis

Binomial name
- Tosapusia sauternesensis (Guillot de Suduiraut, 1997)

Synonyms
- Vexillum (Costellaria) sauternesense Guillot de Suduiraut, 1997; Vexillum sauternesense Guillot de Suduiraut, 1997

= Tosapusia sauternesensis =

Species of gastropod

Tosapusia sauternesensis is a species of sea snail, a marine gastropod mollusk, in the family Costellariidae, the ribbed miters.

== Description ==
The length of the shell attains 43.7 mm.

== Holotype and type locality ==
The holotype of the species (MNHN IM-2000-30178), measured 42.2 mm.

Type Locality : Philippines, Hilutangan Channel between Mactan and Olango Island Group, 160 m.
