= Virginal (disambiguation) =

The virginal, or virginals, is a keyboard instrument.

Virginal may also refer to:

- Virginity, the state of a person who has never engaged in sexual intercourse
- Virginal (poem), an anonymous Middle High German poem
- "Virginal" (song), by Shouta Aoi, 2014

== See also ==
- Virgin (disambiguation)
- Virginity (disambiguation)
