= Virgin (disambiguation) =

A virgin is a person who has not engaged in sexual intercourse.

Virgin may also refer to:

== Places ==
- Virgin, Utah, a town in the United States
- Virgin Islands (disambiguation)
- Virgin Mountains, a range northeast of Lake Mead in the United States
- Virgin River, a tributary of the Colorado River in the U.S. states of Utah, Nevada, and Arizona
- Virgin forest, ancient woodland (UK) or old-growth forest (US)

== People ==
- Arthur Russell Virgin (1877-1968), American and Canadian financier, corporate director, and philanthropist
- Craig Virgin (born 1955), American long-distance runner
- Dee Virgin (born 1993), American football player
- Eric Virgin (officer) (1876–1950), Swedish Air Force general
- Eric Virgin (diplomat) (1920–2004), Swedish diplomat
- Lilian Virgin (born 1939), Swedish politician
- Nerene Virgin (1946–2024), Canadian journalist, actress and TV host
- Roy Virgin (born 1939), English cricketer

== Film and literature ==
- Virgin (2003 film), an American film
- Virgin (2004 film), an Indonesian film
- Virginity (film), a 1937 Czech film
- Virgins (2018 film), a French-Israeli film
- Virgins (2025 film), a comedy film
- The Virgin (film), a 1924 American silent drama film
- The Virgin (novel), a 1985 novel by Bayo Adebowale
- The Virgins (novel), a 2013 novel by Pamela Erens
- Virgins (Gabaldon novella), a 2013 Outlander novella by Diana Gabaldon
- Virgins (novel), a 1984 novel by Caryl Rivers

== Music ==
- Virgin (band), a Polish rock band
  - Virgin (Virgin album), a 2002 album by the Polish pop rock band Virgin
- The Virgins, an American rock band
- Virgin (After School album), a 2011 album by South Korean girl group After School
- Virgin (Lorde album), a 2025 by New Zealand singer Lorde
- Virgins (album), a 2013 album by musician Tim Hecker
- Virgin Records, a record company
- "Virgin", a 1986 song by Spandau Ballet from the album Through the Barricades
- "The Virgin", a song by Daughters from Daughters

== Other uses ==
- Virgin Group, a British conglomerate organization founded by Sir Richard Branson
- Virgin Racing, a Formula 1 racing team
- Virgin (title), a posthumous honorific
- Virgin Mary, the mother of Jesus Christ
- Virgin queen bee
- A way to describe a non-alcoholic beverage
- A commercial grade of olive oil, sometimes also used to describe other cooking oils

== See also ==
- Virgin Trains (disambiguation)
- Virgo (disambiguation)
