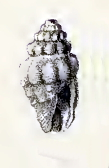
- Original image of a shell of Daphnella thiasotes

Scientific classification
- Kingdom: Animalia
- Phylum: Mollusca
- Class: Gastropoda
- Subclass: Caenogastropoda
- Order: Neogastropoda
- Superfamily: Conoidea
- Family: Raphitomidae
- Genus: Daphnella
- Species: D. thiasotes

Binomial name
- Daphnella thiasotes Melvill & Standen, 1896

Synonyms
- Mangilia thiasotes (Melvill & Standen, 1896)

= Daphnella thiasotes =

Species of gastropod

Daphnella thiasotes is a species of sea snail, a marine gastropod mollusk in the family Raphitomidae.

== Description ==
The length of the shell attains 8 mm, and its diameter 4.25 mm.

(Original description) The solid, fusiform shell contains six whorls. The protoconch is pitchy black, and the remainder are with bright ochreous tinting. In the younger specimens, transverse shining white rows of large gemmae cross the whorls just above the sutures, and in the middle of the body whorl, below, there are ochre bands. In the body whorl this is followed by two smaller rows of gemmae, and then by a pitch black line reaching from the upper portion of the columellar margin, across the back of the shell, to the base of the outer lip. The more mature shell is conspicuous for the very swollen row of white peripheral nodules, banded below with fulvous colour. The outer lip is slightly incrassate. The siphonal canal is short. The columellar margin simple.

== Distribution ==
This marine species occurs off the Loyalty Islands and the Mactan Island, Philippines
