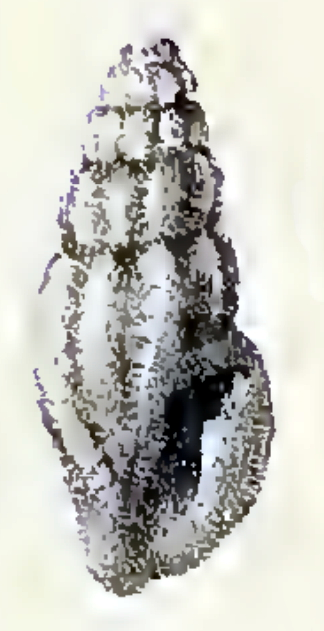
- Original image of a shell of Mangelia stibarochila

Scientific classification
- Kingdom: Animalia
- Phylum: Mollusca
- Class: Gastropoda
- Subclass: Caenogastropoda
- Order: Neogastropoda
- Superfamily: Conoidea
- Family: Mangeliidae
- Genus: Mangelia
- Species: M. stibarochila

Binomial name
- Mangelia stibarochila Melvill, J.C. & R. Standen, 1897, "1896"

Synonyms
- Mangilia stibarochila Melvill, J.C. & R. Standen, 1897, "1896" (original combination)

= Mangelia stibarochila =

Species of gastropod

Mangelia stibarochila is a species of sea snail, a marine gastropod mollusk in the family Mangeliidae.

This is a taxon inquirendum.

== Description ==
The length of this shell attains 5 mm, its diameter 2 mm.

(Original description) The small, stoutly-built solid shell contains six whorls of which two in the protoconch. It is of a lively ochraceous brown, fading into white across the ribs. Some of these are much thickened and crossed by lirae, of which a few are stronger than the others. The aperture is narrowly oblong. The sinus is wide and half extending across the very thick outer lip which is particoloured, white above and ochre below. The columellar margin is clear ochraceous brown and simple.

== Distribution ==
This marine species occurs off the Loyalty Islands and off Mactan Island, Philippines
