= Cordova Desalination Plant =

Desalination plant in the Philippines

- Location of the CDP within Metro Cebu.
- Interactive map of Cordova Desalination Plant
- Location: Cordova, Cebu, Philippines
- Coordinates: 10°14′35.4″N 123°56′33.2″E
- Estimated output: 20 million L (5.3 million US gal) per day
- Extended output: 50 million L (13 million US gal) per day
- Technology: Reverse osmosis
- Operation date: June 7, 2024

The Cordova Desalination Plant (CDP) is a desalination facility in Cordova in Cebu province, Philippines. It is the first desalination plant in the Philippines.

== History ==
Isla Mactan Cordova Corporation (IMCC) would be awarded a contract to supply water for the Metropolitan Cebu Water District in June 2021. To fulfill the contract, the construction of a desalination plant in Cordova, Cebu began. Watermatic Philippines, a joint venture of Vivant and Israeli firm WaterMatic International, led the construction.

It is built under a build–operate–transfer scheme under the private-public partnership setup.

On September 7, 2023, the desalination equipment was installed. By that month the whole facility is already 70 percent complete.

The IMCC plant started operations on June 7, 2024, initially producing 5 million L (1.3 million US gal) of processed water daily., becoming the first desalination plant in the Philippines, where drinking water has only been sourced groundwater and surface water.

== Facility ==
The Cordova Desalination Plant spans the barangays of Buagsong and Catarman, Poblacion of Cordova municipality in Cebu standing on a 3.5 hectares (8.6 acres) property. Using seawater reverse osmosis technology, it has the capacity to produce 20 million L (5.3 million US gal) of water daily serving residents of Metro Cebu. This can be expanded to 50 million L (13 million US gal).

== Management ==
The Cordova Desalination Plant is operated and managed by the Isla Mactan Cordova Corporation (IMCC; dba as Vivant Water), a subsidy of Vivant Hydrocore Holdings. It supplies water to the Metropolitan Cebu Water District. After 25-years, it is set to be turned over to the Cordova local government.
