= Caryl Rivers =

American novelist

- Born: United States
- Occupations: Author, journalist
- Writing career
- Genres: Drama, humor, current events, politics, journalism

Caryl Rivers is an American novelist and journalist. Her 1984 novel Virgins was a New York Times Best Seller and sold millions of copies around the world. Her articles have appeared in major publications such as The Huffington Post, The New York Times, The Washington Post, The Boston Globe and the Los Angeles Times.

== Career ==
Rivers is a professor of journalism at Boston University. In 1979 she and historian Howard Zinn were among a group of Boston University faculty members who defended the right of the school's clerical workers to strike and were threatened with dismissal after refusing to cross a picket line. In 2008 Rivers was awarded The Helen Thomas Award for Lifetime Achievement which is awarded to an individual for a lifetime of contribution to the journalism profession.

Rivers is also the author of several other books including the 1986 sequel to Virgins, Girls Forever Brave and True, Slick Spins and Fractured Facts: How Cultural Myths Distort the News, Same Difference: How Gender Myths Are Hurting Our Relationships, Our Children, and Our Jobs and Camelot, a novel set during the Kennedy administration.

== Publications ==
- Virgins
- Girls Forever Brave and True
- Slick Spins and Fractured Facts: How Cultural Myths Distort the News
- Same Difference: How Gender Myths Are Hurting Our Relationships, Our Children, and Our Jobs
- Camelot

== Awards ==
- 2008, The Helen Thomas Award for Lifetime Achievement
