= Cordova, Cebu =

Municipality in Cebu, Philippines

Cordova Cordoba
- Municipality
- Municipality of Cordova
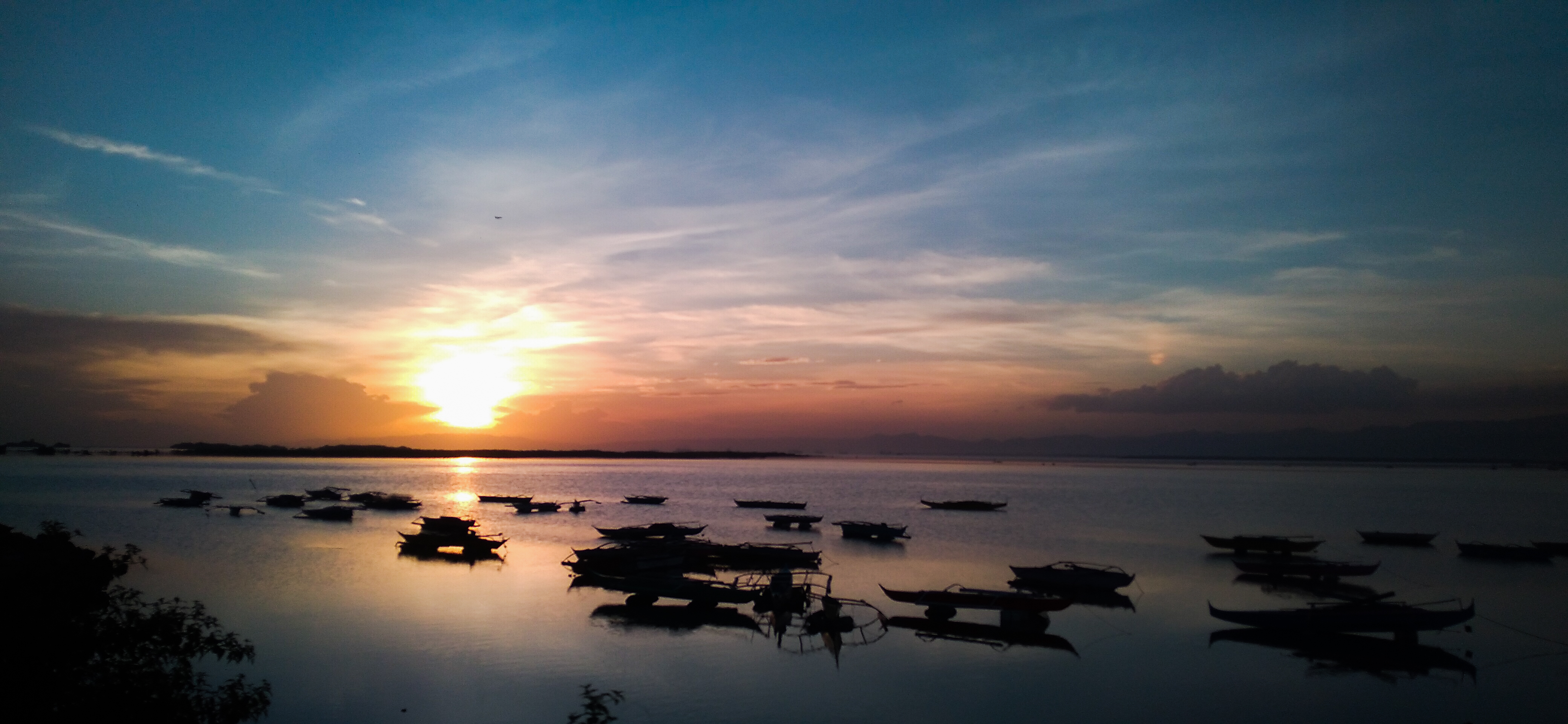
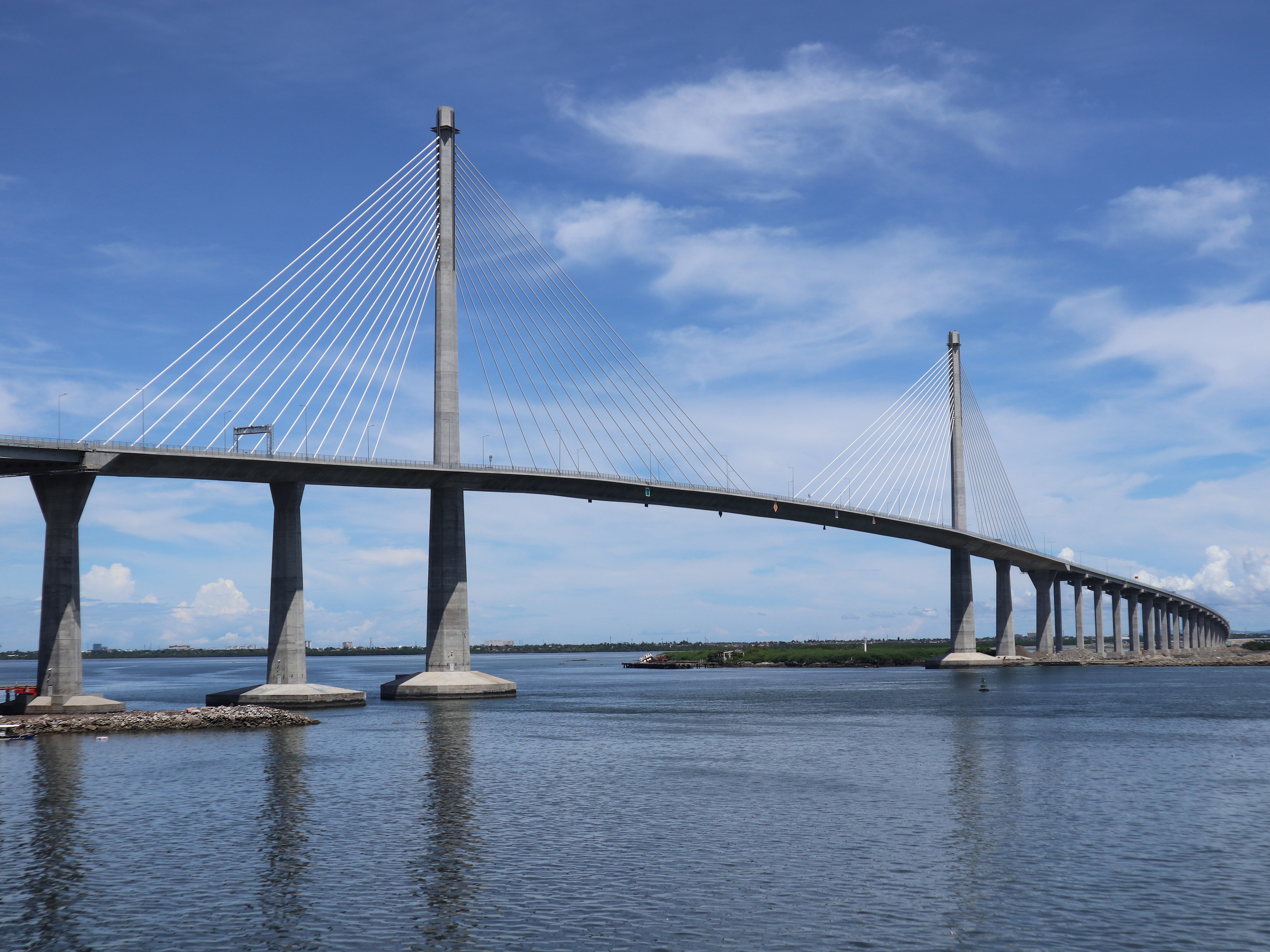
- Sunset in Cordova Cebu–Cordova Link Expressway

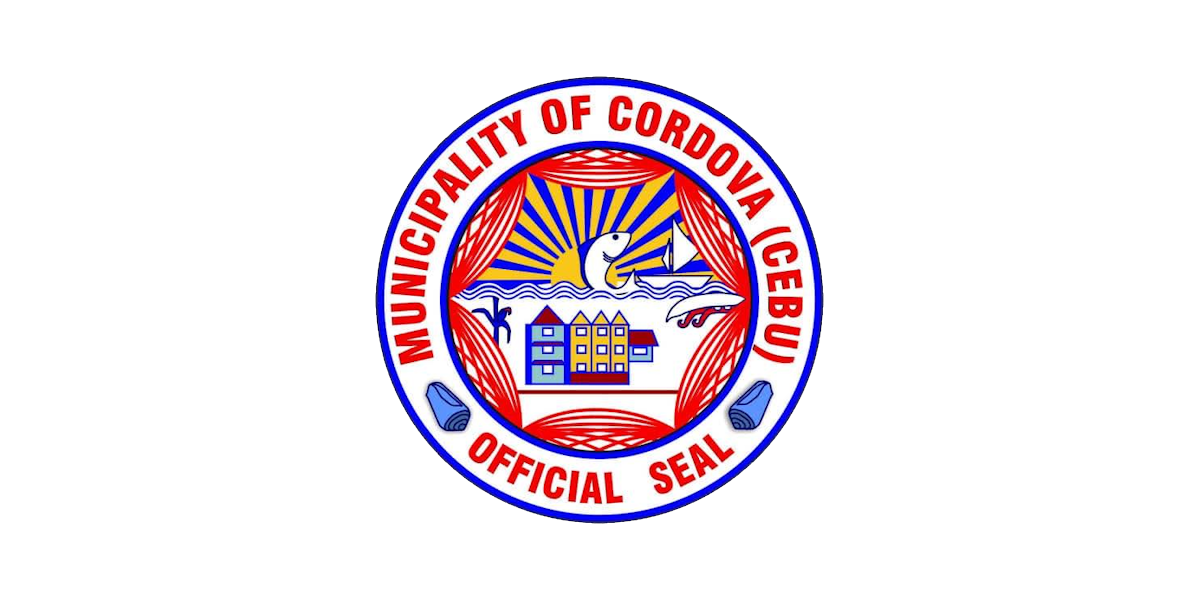
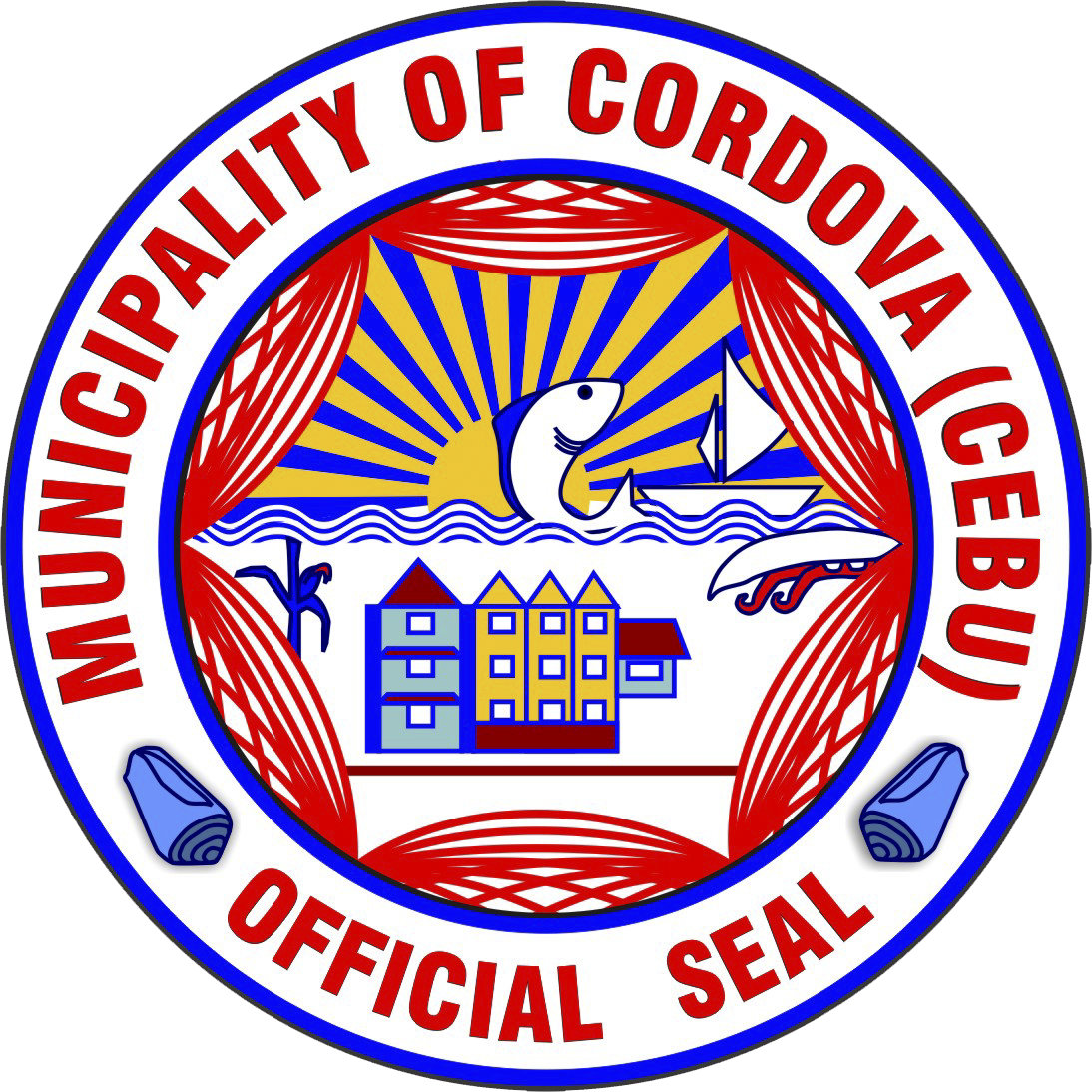
- Flag Seal

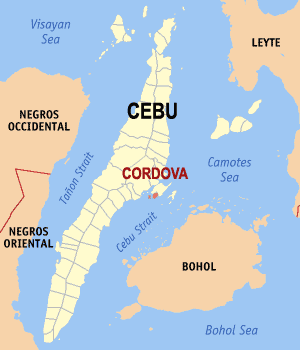
- Map of Cebu with Cordova highlighted
- Interactive map of Cordova
- Location within the Philippines
- Coordinates: 10°15′07″N 123°56′56″E
- Country: Philippines
- Region: Central Visayas
- Province: Cebu
- District: 6th district
- Founded: 1864
- Barangays: 13 (see Barangays)

Government
  - Type: Sangguniang Bayan
  - Mayor: Cesar E. Suan (1-Cebu)
  - Vice Mayor: Victor S. Tago III (Lakas)
  - Representative: Daphne Lagon (Lakas)
  - Municipal Council: Members: Jerome N. Lepiten; Dason Patric A. Lagon; Remar A. Baguio; Jose A. Wahing; Liera Mae Y. Casquejo; Lemuel W. Pogoy; Chito D. Bentazal; Natileigh Marie Therese S. Sitoy
  - Electorate: 53,261 voters (2025)

Area
  - Total: 17.15 km^{2} (6.62 sq mi)
- Elevation: 2.0 m (6.6 ft)
- Highest elevation: 26 m (85 ft)
- Lowest elevation: −2 m (−6.6 ft)

Population (2024 census)
  - Total: 72,915
  - Density: 4,252/km^{2} (11,010/sq mi)
  - Households: 16,299

Economy
  - Income class: 1st municipal income class
  - Poverty incidence: 18.36% (2023)
  - Revenue: ₱ 319 million (2024)
  - Assets: ₱ 761.4 million (2024)
  - Expenditure: ₱ 238.3 million (2024)
  - Liabilities: ₱ 216.2 million (2024)

Service provider
  - Electricity: Mactan Electric Company (MECO)
  - Water: Metropolitan Cebu Water District (MCWD)
- Time zone: UTC+8 (PST)
- ZIP code: 6017
- PSGC: 0702220000
- IDD : area code: +63 (0)32
- Native languages: Cebuano; Tagalog
- Website: cordova.gov.ph

Cordova, officially the Municipality of Cordova (Cebuano: Lungsod sa Cordova; Filipino: Bayan ng Cordova), is a municipality in the province of Cebu, Philippines. According to the 2024 census, it has a population of 72,915 people.

Also spelled Cordoba, most of the municipality lies on separate islands off the southern coast of Mactan Island. It is connected by two bridges to the main island of Mactan, which itself is connected to mainland Cebu by the two bridges between Mandaue and Lapu-Lapu City. The Cebu–Cordova Link Expressway, opened in 2022, connects it directly to mainland Cebu in Cebu City.

Cordova is bordered to the north by Lapu-Lapu City, to the west by the Mactan Channel, to the east by the Hilutangan Channel and Olango Island, and to the south by the Cebu Strait.

Cordova is a part of Metro Cebu.

== History ==
On 22 May 1863, the Spanish Governor General of the Philippines Rafael Echagüe y Bermingham (San Sebastián, 1815 - Madrid, 1887) created a new town comprising the barrios of Gabi, Day‑as and Pilipul (now called Pilipog), all of which are located on the southeastern tip of Mactan Island. Some authors think he chose the name Cordoba which means "stark nakedness and bare", but they do not indicate in what language. The decree of becoming a municipality only became effective in 1864.

However, before being appointed Governor General, in 1858, Rafael Echagüe y Bermingham was representative in the Spanish Congress of Deputies for the province of Cordoba (Spain), so he should have given that name in memory of his previous experiences.

In addition to Spain and the Philippines, there are other cities or provinces named Cordoba, Cordova or Las Cordobas in Argentina, Colombia, USA and Mexico, all of them founded and named by Spanish, in memory of the Spanish Cordoba or the surname/family name of its founders.

Cordova became a municipality in 1864, and from 1913 up to the present, a total of 15 mayors governed the district.

== Geography ==
Cordova consists of a main island, bordering on and separated from Mactan Island by a narrow stream, as well as the islets of Gilutongan (also spelled Hilutungan), Nalusuan, Shell, Tongo and Lava. The two islets of Gilutongan and Nalusuan are part of the Olango Island Group in the middle of the Cebu Strait. Its land area is 789.6 hectares (1,951 acres), of which 740.85 hectares (1,830.7 acres) constitutes the main island and 48.75 hectares (120.5 acres) are outlying islets. Cordova is 18 kilometres (11 mi) from Lapu-Lapu City and 28 kilometres (17 mi) from Cebu City.

The surface of the town consists entirely of karstic limestone rock geologically associated with the Plio-Pleistocene Carcar Formation, dated to 2½–3 million years ago. The topography of Cordova is flat land, the highest point being only 10 metres (33 ft) above sea level.

=== Climate ===
Cordova Average annual temperature in Cordova is 27·6°C Humidity 75–85%

Climate chart (precipitation, max. and min. temperature)
| J | F | M | A | M | J | J | A | S | O | N | D |
| 114 30 23 | 85 30 23 | 50 31 23 | 56 33 24 | 93 33 25 | 172 32 24 | 188 32 24 | 148 32 24 | 168 32 24 | 194 32 24 | 164 32 24 | 130 31 23 |
- █ Average max. and min. temperatures in °C
- █ Precipitation totals in mm
- Source: Climate: Cordova
Imperial conversion
| J | F | M | A | M | J | J | A | S | O | N | D |
| 4.5 86 73 | 3.3 87 73 | 2 89 73 | 2.2 91 75 | 3.7 92 76 | 6.8 90 76 | 7.4 89 75 | 5.8 90 75 | 6.6 89 75 | 7.6 89 75 | 6.5 89 75 | 5.1 87 74 |
- █ Average max. and min. temperatures in °F
- █ Precipitation totals in inches

The climate of Cordova is of Coronas type III, meaning the seasons are not very pronounced and are classified as hot and humid.

Its temperature ranges from 18 to 35 °C (65 to 95 °F), with a mean high temperature of 31 °C (88 °F) and a mean low of 23 °C (74 °F).

=== Barangays ===
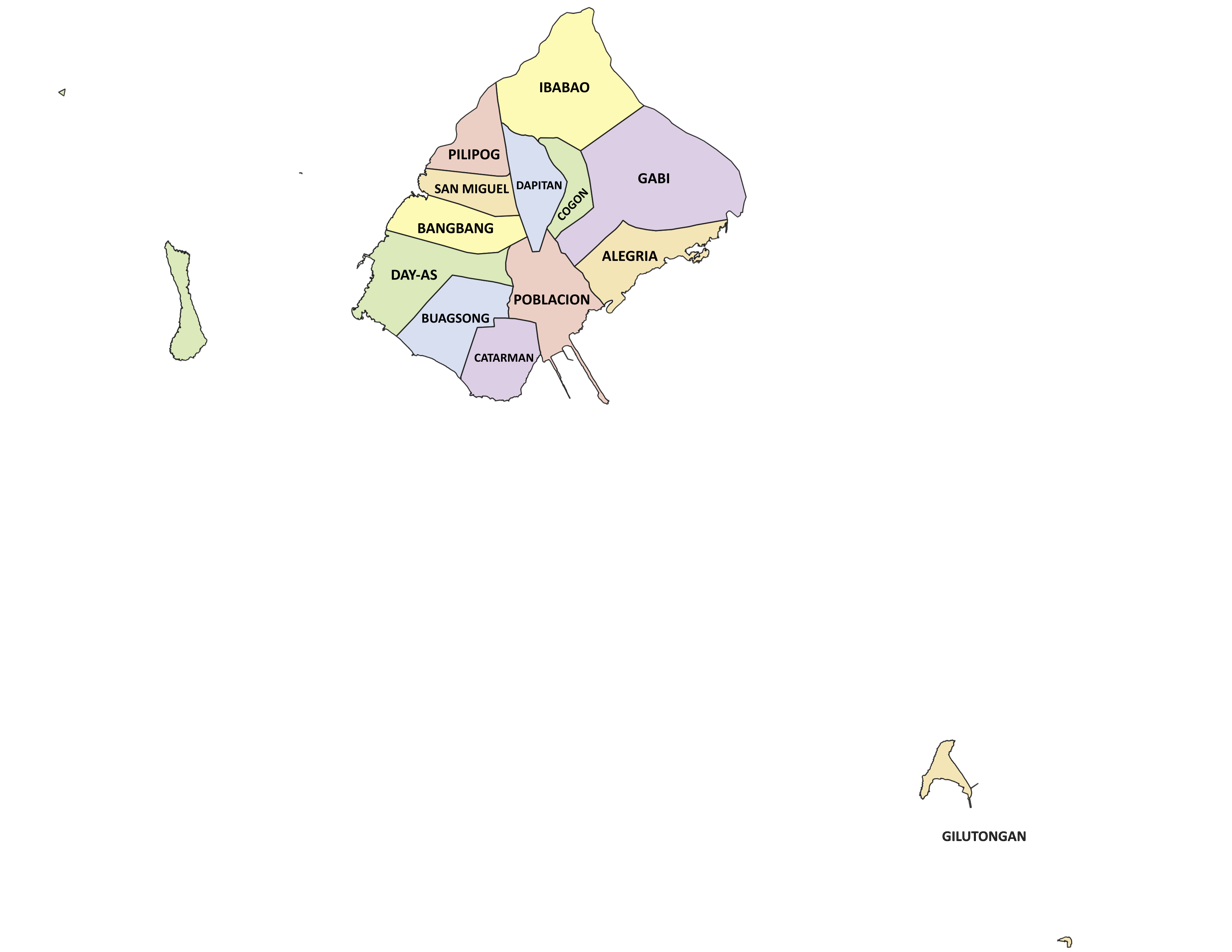
Political map of Cordova

Cordova is politically subdivided into 13 barangays. Each barangay consists of puroks and some have sitios.

| PSGC | Barangay | Population | | | ±% p.a. | |
| | | 2024 | | 2010 | | |
|---|---|---|---|---|---|---|
| 072220001 | Alegria | 6.1% | 4,461 | 3,540 | ▴ | 1.62% |
| 072220002 | Bangbang | 9.0% | 6,554 | 5,287 | ▴ | 1.50% |
| 072220003 | Buagsong | 7.9% | 5,733 | 3,936 | ▴ | 2.64% |
| 072220004 | Catarman | 8.0% | 5,844 | 4,596 | ▴ | 1.68% |
| 072220005 | Cogon | 4.0% | 2,914 | 2,715 | ▴ | 0.49% |
| 072220006 | Dapitan | 4.6% | 3,386 | 3,149 | ▴ | 0.50% |
| 072220007 | Day‑as | 6.7% | 4,892 | 4,241 | ▴ | 1.00% |
| 072220008 | Gabi | 6.5% | 4,713 | 3,478 | ▴ | 2.13% |
| 072220009 | Gilutongan | 2.2% | 1,606 | 1,640 | ▾ | −0.15% |
| 072220010 | Ibabao | 14.0% | 10,227 | 8,355 | ▴ | 1.41% |
| 072220011 | Pilipog | 6.4% | 4,660 | 4,273 | ▴ | 0.60% |
| 072220012 | Poblacion | 13.9% | 10,163 | 9,625 | ▴ | 0.38% |
| 072220013 | San Miguel | 5.5% | 4,015 | 3,642 | ▴ | 0.68% |
| | Total | | 72,915 | 50,353 | ▴ | 2.60% |

== Demographics ==
Population census of Cordova
| Year | Pop. | ±% p.a. |
|---|---|---|
| 1903 | 5,315 | — |
| 1918 | 5,798 | +0.58% |
| 1939 | 6,677 | +0.67% |
| 1948 | 7,116 | +0.71% |
| 1960 | 9,298 | +2.25% |
| 1970 | 12,538 | +3.03% |
| 1975 | 14,101 | +2.38% |
| 1980 | 16,455 | +3.13% |
| 1990 | 22,331 | +3.10% |
| 1995 | 26,613 | +3.34% |
| 2000 | 34,032 | +5.41% |
| 2007 | 45,066 | +3.95% |
| 2010 | 50,353 | +4.12% |
| 2015 | 59,712 | +3.30% |
| 2020 | 70,595 | +3.59% |
| 2024 | 72,915 | +0.78% |
Source: Philippine Statistics Authority

== Economy ==
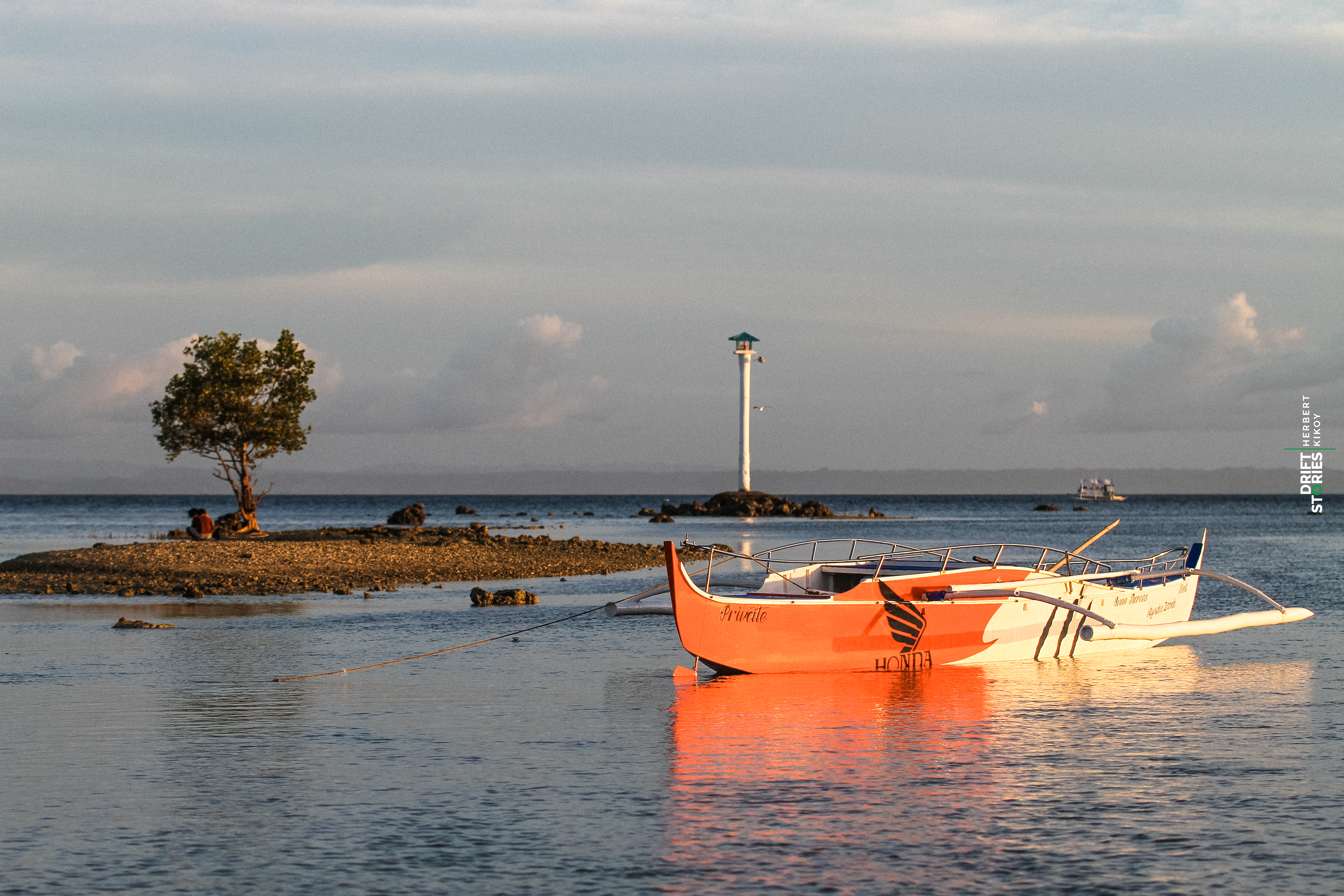
Bantayan Lighthouse

Poverty incidence of Cordova (%)

Source: Philippine Statistics Authority

== Tourism ==
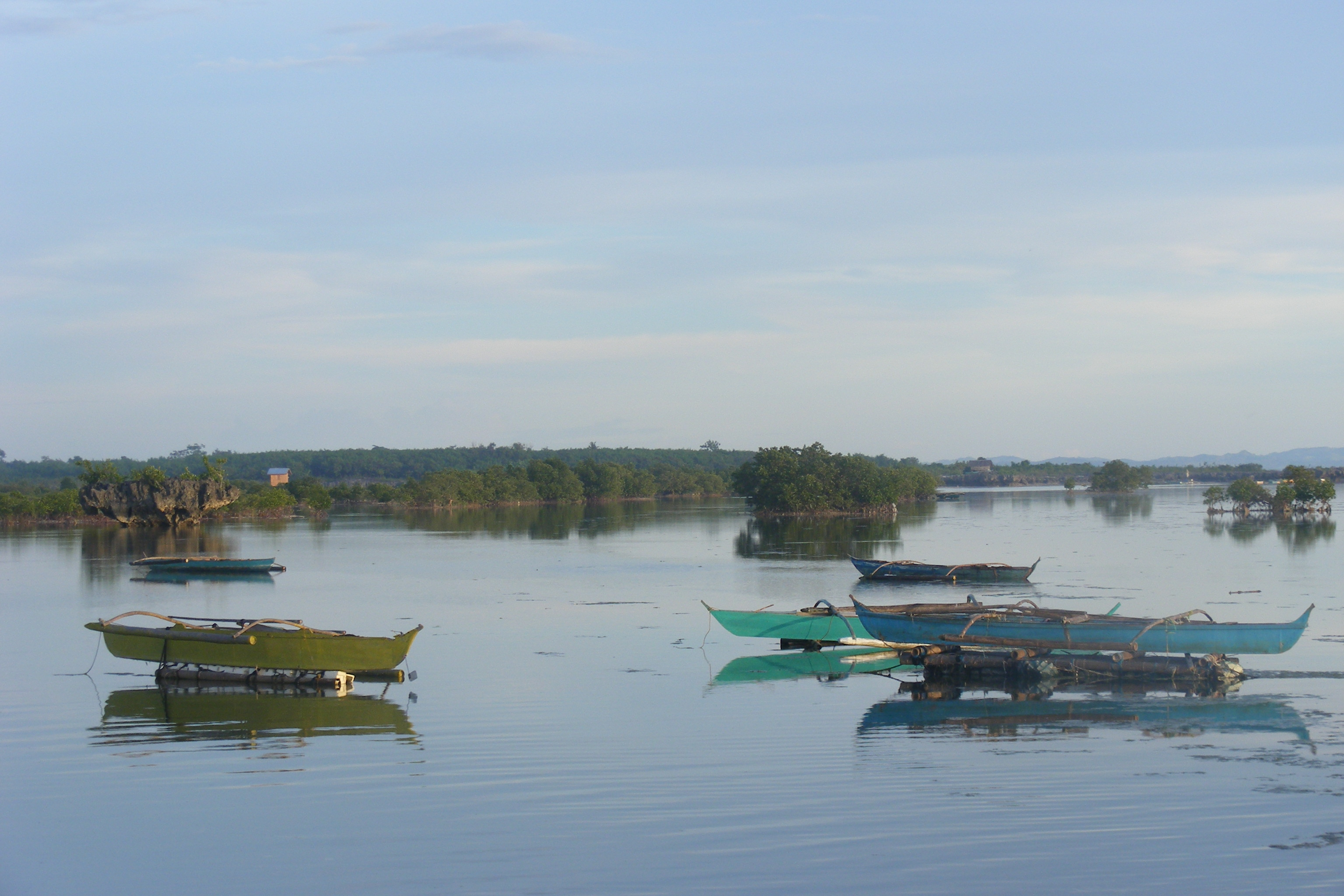
Kamanpay Public Beach

Cordova is a quiet fisherman town off the coast of mainland Cebu. It has several hotels, resorts and accommodations, which include:

- Solea Mactan Resort
- Gilutongan Marine Sanctuary
- Nalusuan Island Resort and Marine Sanctuary
- 10k Roses Café near Day‑as Boardwalk and Marine Park
- Bakhawan Paradise
- Entoy's Bakasihan

A special attraction is the mangrove forest and swamp area. The best access to this area is the Day-as Boardwalk and Marine Park. The total mangrove plantation is estimated to cover more or less one hundred hectares (250 acres). Most of the mangrove forest is located in the barangays of Pilipog, Bangbang, San Miguel, Day‑as and Catarman.

== Infrastructure ==
=== Utilities ===
- Cordova Desalination Plant

=== Transportation ===
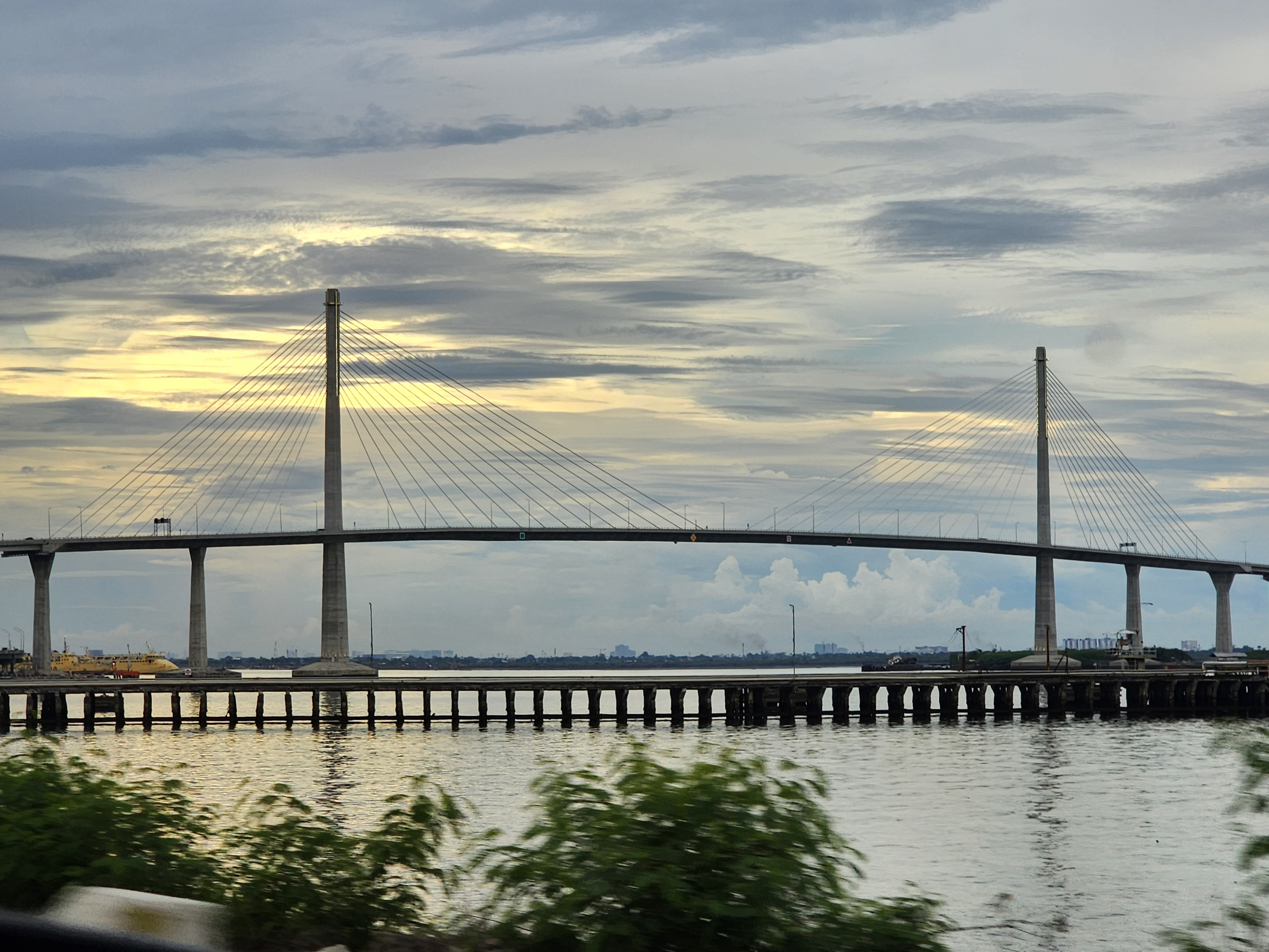
Cebu–Cordova Link Expressway

The Cebu–Cordova Link Expressway, which was completed in 2022, connects Cordova to Cebu City in mainland Cebu. This is the third bridge connecting mainland Cebu to Mactan Island, after the Mactan–Mandaue Bridge and the Marcelo Fernan Bridge.

== Education ==
The following public (unless otherwise noted) schools in Cordova are administered by one school district under the Schools Division of Cebu Province.

Elementary schools:

- Alegria Elementary School
- Bangbang Elementary School
- Buagsong Elementary School
- Catarman Elementary School
- Cogon Elementary School
- Cordova Central Elementary School
- Day-as Elementary School
- Gabi Elementary School
- Ibabao Elementary School
- Pilipog Elementary School

High schools:

- Cordova Catholic Cooperative School
- Cordova National High School
- Pilipog Night High School

College:

- Cordova Public College

Integrated schools:

- Gilutongan Integrated School
- Thrice Admirable Integrated School (private)

== Sources ==
- Cebu Daily News, Jessie D. Campos (27 January 2016). "Cordova, Metro Pacific ink deal for 3rd Mactan bridge". Archived from the original on 29 January 2016.
- Gonzales, Glenda R. (December 2004). "Metro Cebu: A Metropolitan Area in Need of Coordinative Body" (PDF). Discussion Paper. 2004-49. PIDS. Archived (PDF) from the original on 10 March 2016.
- Philippine Star, Marieta Reyes (2 May 2016). "Cebu-Cordova bridge to boost Central Visayas economy". Archived from the original on 2 May 2016.
- Sotto, Filipina; Gatus, Joey; Ross, Michael; Portigo, M^{a} Fe; Freire, Francis (2001). Coastal Environmental Profile of Olango Island, Cebu, Philippines (PDF). ISBN 971-9229012.
