= Hilutangan Channel =

- Location within the Philippines Hilutangan Channel (Philippines)
- Location: Central Visayas, Philippines
- Coordinates: 10°16′21″N 124°0′51.12″E
- Type: channel

Hilutangan Channel (or Gilutungan Channel) is a deep water channel that separates Mactan Island from Olango Island.

The Mactan Reef Flat lies on the port (left) side of this channel and the Olango Reef Flat lies on the starboard (right) side of this channel.

It is one of the three channels that connect the Cebu Strait to the Camotes Sea:

- the Mactan Channel (which separates Cebu from Mactan)
- the Hilutangan Channel (which separates Mactan from Olango)
- the Olango Channel (which separates Olango from Bohol).

The holotype of the sea snail Tosapusia sauternesensis was described in the channel.

== See also ==
- Canigao Channel - separates the islands of Bohol and Leyte
- Tañon Strait - separates the islands of Negros and Cebu
