= Nalusuan =

Geography
- Coordinates: 10°11′26″N 124°00′02″E
- Adjacent to: Camotes Sea

Administration
- Philippines
- Region: Central Visayas
- Province: Cebu
- Municipality: Cordova
- Barangay: Gilutongan

Nalusuan is a natural island resort in the Cebu Strait, the Philippines, and one of the islands comprising the Olango Island Group. The island, which measures close to a hectare, is situated between Mactan Island and the Province of Bohol. Originally a sand bar, it was reclaimed to allow the construction of the Nalusuan Island Resort, which occupies the entire island.

The island was originally and locally known as "kalusuan" meaning "a place of penises" in Cebuano. The local fishermen named it as such because the waters surrounding the island is teeming with sea cucumbers, which looked like the male genitalia.

The island is administratively within the jurisdiction of the town of Cordova and specifically in the barangay of Gilutongan.

On May 18, 2009, American swimmer Paul Vanhoven swam unassisted from Mactan Island to Nalusuan in an effort to raise awareness of the damage that dynamite fisherman were causing to local reefs.

Management of the Nalusuan Marine Sanctuary have long been trying to protect the local waters from dynamite blasts and over-fishing. Fish populations have rebounded back to healthy levels at the Sanctuary, and large grouper are becoming a common site again. In May 2009, a small nurse shark was sighted at the island, as more top predators return.
