= Virgin Islands (disambiguation) =

The Virgin Islands are an archipelago in the Caribbean Sea.

Virgin Islands or Virgin Island may also refer to:

== Places ==
=== Virgin Islands ===
- British Virgin Islands, an overseas territory of the United Kingdom
- United States Virgin Islands, an unincorporated territory of the United States
  - Danish Virgin Islands, a former Danish colony
- Spanish Virgin Islands or Passage Islands, politically part of Puerto Rico
- Dutch Virgin Islands, a Dutch colony from 1625–1680

=== Elsewhere ===
- Jomfruene (Norwegian for "the virgins"), a group of Subantarctic islands
- Île Vierge, islet with a lighthouse, off the north coast of Brittany, France
- Pungtud Island, more commonly known in Bohol as Virgin Island
- Silion, an island in Cebu, Philippines
- Virgin Island is a Pacific coastal island in Aysén Province, Chile

== Arts and entertainment ==
- Virgin Islands (album), 1983 album by Cusco, later released as Virgin Island
- L'Île vierge, 1897 work by Camille Lemonnier
- Virgin Island (film), a 1958 British film
- Virgin Island (TV series), a 2025 British reality television series

== See also ==
- Blue Virgin Isles, 1978 album by Ted Gärdestad
- Our Virgin Island, 1953 memoir by Robb White
