= Girls Forever Brave and True =

1986 novel by Caryl Rivers

- Author: Caryl Rivers
- Language: English
- Genre: Fiction
- Publisher: St. Martin's Press
- Publication date: 1986
- Publication place: United States
- Pages: 371
- Preceded by: Virgins

Girls Forever Brave and True (also known as Girls No More) is a 1986 novel written by Caryl Rivers.

It is the sequel to the 1984 novel Virgins.

== Overview ==
The story of three women, Peg, Constance and Kitty, that live, love and work in Washington, D.C.
