= Virgin Trains (disambiguation) =

Virgin Trains was a train operating company in the United Kingdom from 1997 to 2019.

Virgin Trains may also refer to:

== United States train operator ==
- Brightline, a rail system in Florida, United States that was previously known as Virgin Trains USA

== United Kingdom train operators ==
- Virgin Rail Group, holding company for some of the Virgin Group's rail franchises in the United Kingdom
  - Virgin CrossCountry, former operator of the CrossCountry rail franchise
  - Virgin Trains ExpressCoach, a former coach brand in England
- Virgin Trains East Coast, former operator of the InterCity East Coast rail franchise in the United Kingdom
- Virgin Trains (open-access operator) prospective open access operator in the United Kingdom

== Trains ==
- Virgin Azuma, marketing name for the British Rail Class 800 and British Rail Class 801 trains
- Virgin Pendolino, marketing name for the British Rail Class 390 trains
- Virgin Super Voyager, marketing name for the British Rail Class 221 trains
- Virgin Voyager, marketing name for the British Rail Class 220 trains
