= Virginity (disambiguation) =

Virginity is the state of a person who has never copulated.

Virginity may also refer to:

== Virginity ==
- Virginity of Mary
- Virginity pledge

== Music ==
- Virginity, an album by Bleeding Knees Club
- Virginity (song), by NMB48
- "Virginity", song by System of a Down
- "Virginity", song by The Piranhas
- "Virginity", song by Rebecca (band)
