= Virgins (novel) =

1984 novel by Caryl Rivers

- Author: Caryl Rivers
- Language: English
- Genre: Fiction
- Publisher: Pocket Books
- Publication date: 1984
- Publication place: United States
- Followed by: Girls Forever Brave and True

Virgins is a 1984 novel written by Caryl Rivers.

Rivers wrote a 1986 sequel called Girls Forever Brave and True.

== Overview ==
A coming of age story of Catholic high school girls in the 1950s.
