= Olango Island Group =

Group of islands in the Philippines

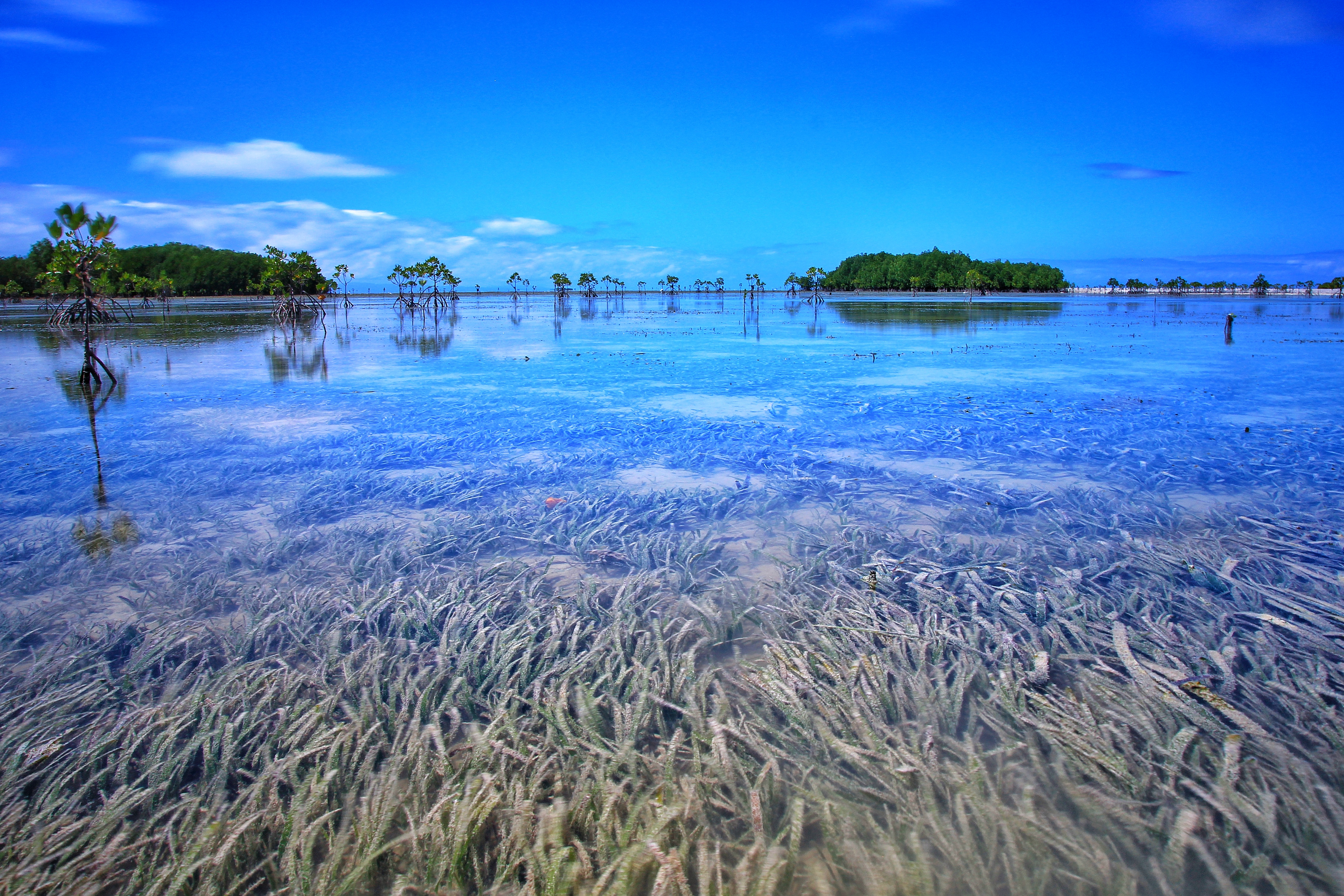
- A portion of the Olango Island Wildlife Sanctuary

- Location within Philippines Location within Visayas

Geography
- Location: Cebu
- Coordinates: 10°16′N 124°03′E
- Total islands: 7
- Major islands: Olango Island
- Area: 1,030 ha (2,500 acres)

Administration
- Administration
- City: Lapu-Lapu
- Municipality: Cordova, Cebu

Demographics
- Population: 41,128 (2020)
- Pop. density: 4,000/km^{2} (10000/sq mi)

Ramsar Wetland
- Official name: Olango Island Wildlife Sanctuary
- Designated: July 1, 1994
- Reference no.: 656

The Olango Island Group is a group of islands found in the Central Visayas region of the Philippines. It comprises Olango island and 6 satellite islets namely: Caubian, Camungi, Caohagan, Gilutongan, Nalusuan, Pangan-an, and Sulpa. The island group has a total land area of approximately 1,030 hectares (2,500 acres). It is divided under the jurisdiction of the city of Lapu-Lapu and the municipality of Cordova, Cebu. It lies 5 kilometers (3.1 mi) east of Mactan and is a major tourist destination in Cebu. It is known for its wildlife sanctuary. The entire area is the first declared Ramsar Wetland Site in the Philippines, as recognized in 1994.

== Geography ==
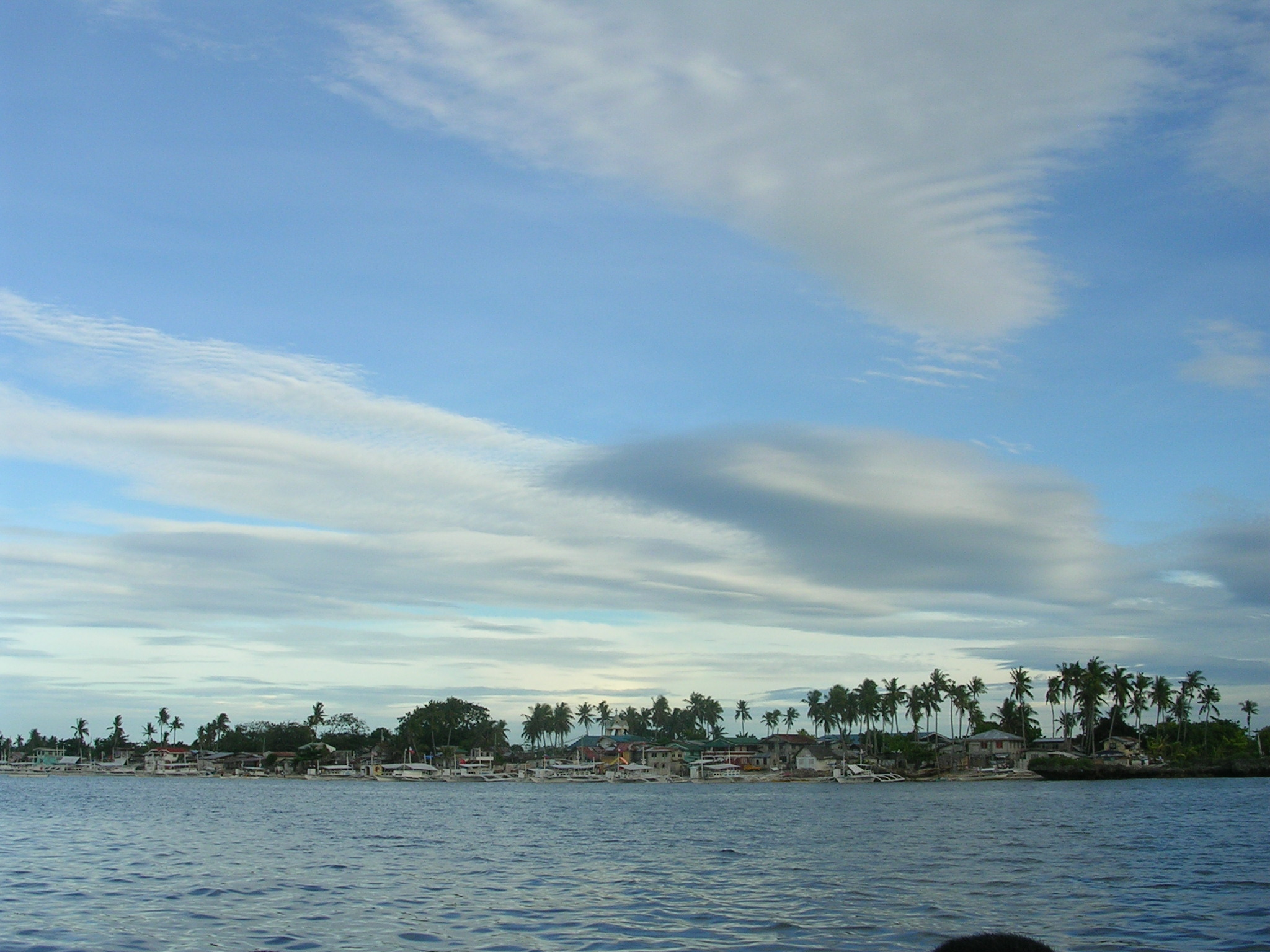
View of Olango Island

The Olango Group of islands consists of seven islands. Located 5 kilometres (3.1 mi) east of Mactan Island, Olango Island and its satellite islets lies between the Cebu Strait to the south and the Camotes Sea to the north. To the west is the Hilutangan Channel (which separates it from Mactan Island) while to the east is the Olango Channel (which separates it from Bohol).

=== Land area ===
Olango Islands has a total land area of approximately 1,030 hectares (2,500 acres). The reef flat-lagoon surrounding the island of Olango is considered one of the most extensive reef areas in the Central Visayas. A total of 4,482 hectares (11,080 acres) of extensive sandy beach, rocky shoreline, inshore flats, seagrass beds, coral reefs, mangrove forest, mudflats, and salt marsh grass surround Olango and its satellite islets.

=== Topography ===
The Olango group of islands is an island group composed of the island of Olango and six satellite islets. The six neighboring islets are Sulpa, Gilutongan (also spelled Hilutangan), Nalusuan, Caohagan, Pangan-an, and Camungi. These are bound by continuous fringing reefs (steep reef wall on the west and sloping reef at the east coast of Olango) and reef flats. The islands are low-lying with elevation reaching no more than 10 metres (33 ft) above sea level. At the center of these islands is a vast tidal flat, which includes the 920-hectare (2,300-acre) area of the Olango Island Wildlife Sanctuary.

=== Geology ===
Olango Islands are raised coral reefs. Like most of Cebu province, the lithology of the island consists of two unit types:

1. the Plio-Pleistocene Carcar Formation
  Carcar formation is typically a porous coralline limestone characterized by small sinkholes, pitted grooves, and branching pinnacles. This suggests in situ deposition. Its dominant composition are shell, algae, and other carbonate materials, while macro and micro fossils are found abundant in its formation.
2. quaternary alluvium (the youngest lithologic unit)
  Alluvium is mostly found in coastal areas. Calcareous sand derived from the weathering of limestone mostly makes up the tidal flat. This appears as fine to coarse-grained sand mixed with shell fragments.

As a consequence of the geology, water supplies are hard.

=== Climate ===
Cordova

Climate chart (precipitation, max. and min. temperature)
J	F	M	A	M	J	J	A	S	O	N	D
114 30 23	85 30 23	50 31 23	56 33 24	93 33 25	172 32 24	188 32 24	148 32 24	168 32 24	194 32 24	164 32 24	130 31 23
- █ Average max. and min. temperatures in °C
- █ Precipitation totals in mm
- Source: climate-data.org
Imperial conversion
J	F	M	A	M	J	J	A	S	O	N	D
4.5 86 73	3.3 87 73	2 89 73	2.2 91 75	3.7 92 76	6.8 90 76	7.4 89 75	5.8 90 75	6.6 89 75	7.6 89 75	6.5 89 75	5.1 87 74
- █ Average max. and min. temperatures in °F
- █ Precipitation totals in inches

The climate is typically equatorial – temperature range over the year is less than three degrees Celsius change (5.4 °F), and annual rainfall exceeds 1,500 millimetres (59 in). January to April inclusive are less wet than the other months. This supports at least two rice crops per year. The climate in Cordova falls within Coronas climate type III, characterised by not very pronounced maximum rainfall with a short dry season from one to three months and a wet season of nine to ten months. The dry season starts in February and lasts through April sometimes extending to mid‑May.

Olango has a tropical climate, which is typical to the Central Visayas. Most months of the year are marked by significant rainfall. The short dry season has little impact. This location is classified as Am (Tropical monsoon climate) by Köppen–Geiger climate classification system.

The area is relatively hot and humid, with a mean daily temperature range of 23.2 to 33.1 °C (73.8 to 91.6 °F). Daily mean relative humidity ranges from 60 to 94 percent. The annual rainfall averages about 1,562 mm (61.5 in) at Mactan–Cebu International Airport and 1,440 mm (56.7 in) in brgy Maribago, which is located along the eastern coastline of Mactan Island.

Although, the Philippine archipelago lies within the typhoon belt, the island of Olango is shielded from typhoons by the islands of Mactan and Bohol.

== Administration ==
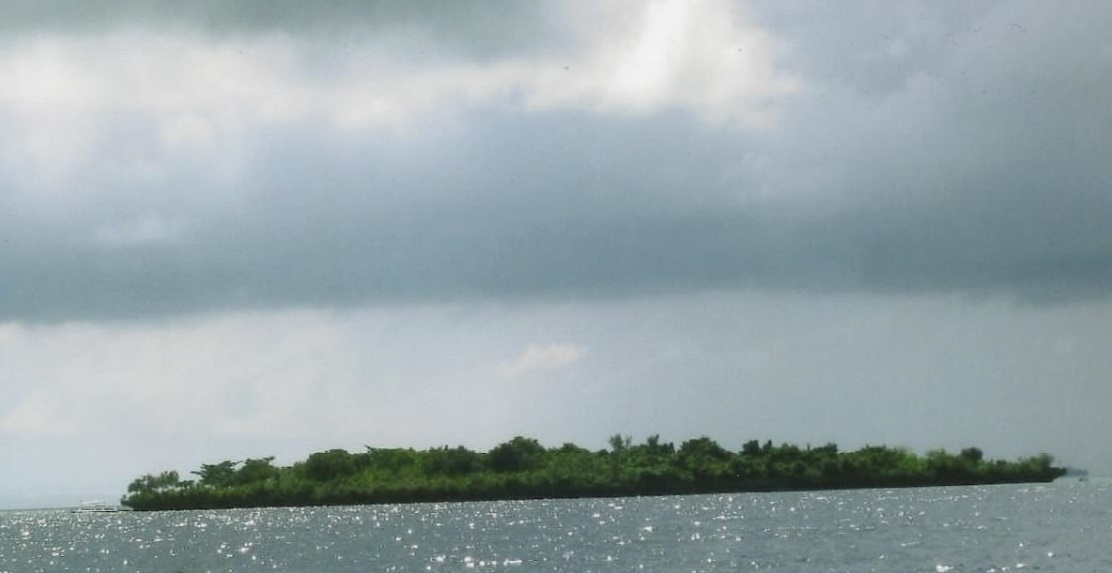
Caohagan Island

Olango and its satellite islets are under the jurisdiction of 2 local government units, the city of Lapu-Lapu and the municipality of Cordova:

- Lapu-Lapu, includes 10 barangays:
    - Baring
    - Caw-oy
    - Sabang
    - Santa Rosa
    - Talima
    - Tingo
    - Tungasan
    - San Vicente
    (all on Olango island)
  - Caohagan
  - Pangan-an
- Cordova, includes one barangay:
  - Gilutongan (consists of Gilutongan island and Nalusuan island)

== Demographics ==
Olango and its satellite islets had a total population of 21,928, composed of 4,382 households in 1995. The average population density of Olango is 34.2 inhabitants per hectare (13.8/acre) individuals, with Gilutongan Island having the highest density of all the barangays at 96.8 individuals per hectare. In the 2010 census, the total population reached 30,996 people.

=== Education ===
Elementary schools are found in all barangays and 4 high schools operating in 4 barangays. At present, there are no college or vocational courses being offered in the island.

=== Source of income ===
The traditional occupations of Olango residents are fishing and coastal-related activities such as shellcraft, aquarium fish collection, boat operations, and seaweed farming. Other sources of income include rainfed farming, personnel services, livestock raising, small enterprise (sari-sari store) and, recently, various types of employment from tourism activities.

== Olango Island Bird Sanctuary ==
Olango Island is a diverse coastal ecosystem consisting of extensive coralline sandflats, mangroves, seagrass beds, and offshore coral reefs. The island's mangroves are most extensive in the Cebu province, and its offshore corals are home to scores of various marine species. The island is virtually flat, and it is surrounded by warm seas and partly sheltered from monsoons and strong trade winds.

Olango Island, situated off Mactan Island in Cebu, is one of the seven best-known flyways in the world for migrating birds. Its main attraction is its 920-hectare Olango Island Wildlife Sanctuary, a haven for migratory birds from Siberia, Northern China, and Japan. These birds flock to the island seeking refuge from the winter climate of other countries. The sanctuary supports the largest concentration of migratory birds found so far in the Philippines. There are 97 species of birds in Olango, 48 of which are migratory species, while the rest are resident birds of the island.

The birds use Olango as a major refueling station as well as a wintering ground. The birds stop by the island on their southward journey to Australia and New Zealand and on their journey back to their nesting grounds. Among the frequent guests are Chinese egrets, Asiatic dowitchers, eastern curlews, plovers, sandpipers, black-tailed godwit and red knot. It is best to visit Olango around the months of July to November just in time for winter in the Northern Hemisphere.

Then President Corazon Aquino declared the 1,020 hectares tidal flats in Olango a protected area under Proclamation No. 903 on May 14, 1992. It was included on the Ramsar List of Wetlands of International Importance on July 1, 1994. It is the Philippines' first wetland of international importance for waterfowl.

Birds in Olango Wildlife Sanctuary

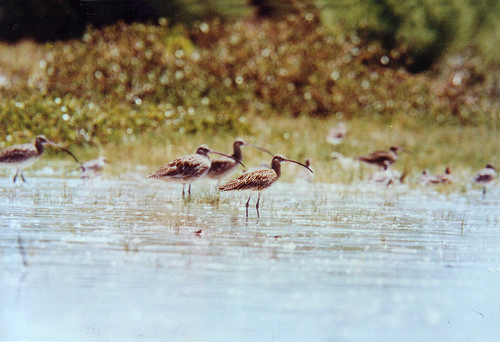
Eastern curlews
Numenius madagascariensis

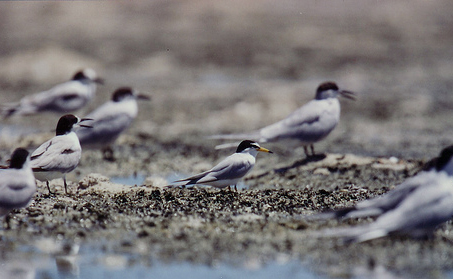
Little terns
Sternula albifrons

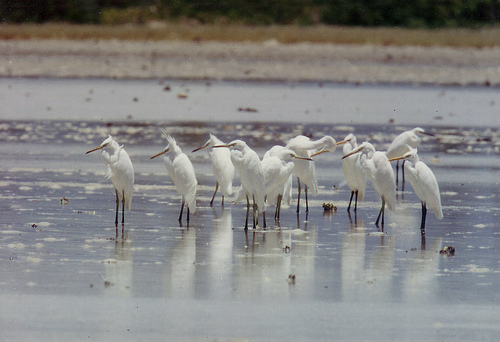
Chinese egrets
Egretta eulophotes

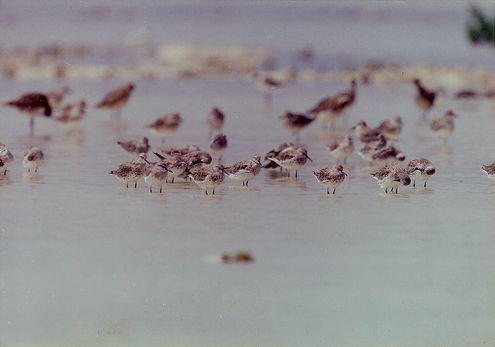
Asiatic dowitchers
Limnodromus semipalmatus

== Dive sites ==
The island of Olango is also known for its dive sites. Tourists can dive in three different sites around the island.

Situated in the northern tip of the island is Mabini Point. Descending to around 35m at the drop-off, one can watch sharks, including hammerheads and the occasional whale shark. Currents around the site are strong and unpredictable.

Olango Island has one of the deepest wall dives around. Baring is along the North-Western side of the island and the wall starts at 60 ft/20m and ends down to about 220 ft/73m before disappearing on a gradual slope. Grey reef sharks, tuna, barracuda, snappers and jacks can be found around the area.

Slightly further south is Santa Rosa. The dive starts with a sandy bottom covered in soft corals, leading to a drop-off at 15m, descending to 50m. There is a good variety of reef fish in the shallows here, while further down are fusiliers, catfish, jacks, snappers and sweetlips, among others.

== See also ==
- List of protected areas of the Philippines
- Olango Channel Map (location & coral reefs detail)

== Sources ==
- Del Rosario, R.A.; Pastor, M.S. & Malapitan, R.T. (April 2005). Controlled Source Magnetotelluric (CSMT) Survey of Malabuyoc Thermal Prospect, Malabuyoc/Alegria, Cebu, Philippine (PDF). World Geothermal Congress. Antalya, Turkey. p. 2 Figure 2: General Geology of Cebu Province.
- Hillmer, Gero & Scholz, Joachim (1986). "Dependence of Quaternary Reef Terrace formation on tectonic and eustatic effects". The Philippine Scientist. 23: 58–64.
