= Cebu Strait =

Strait in Central Visayas, Philippines

- Bohol Strait
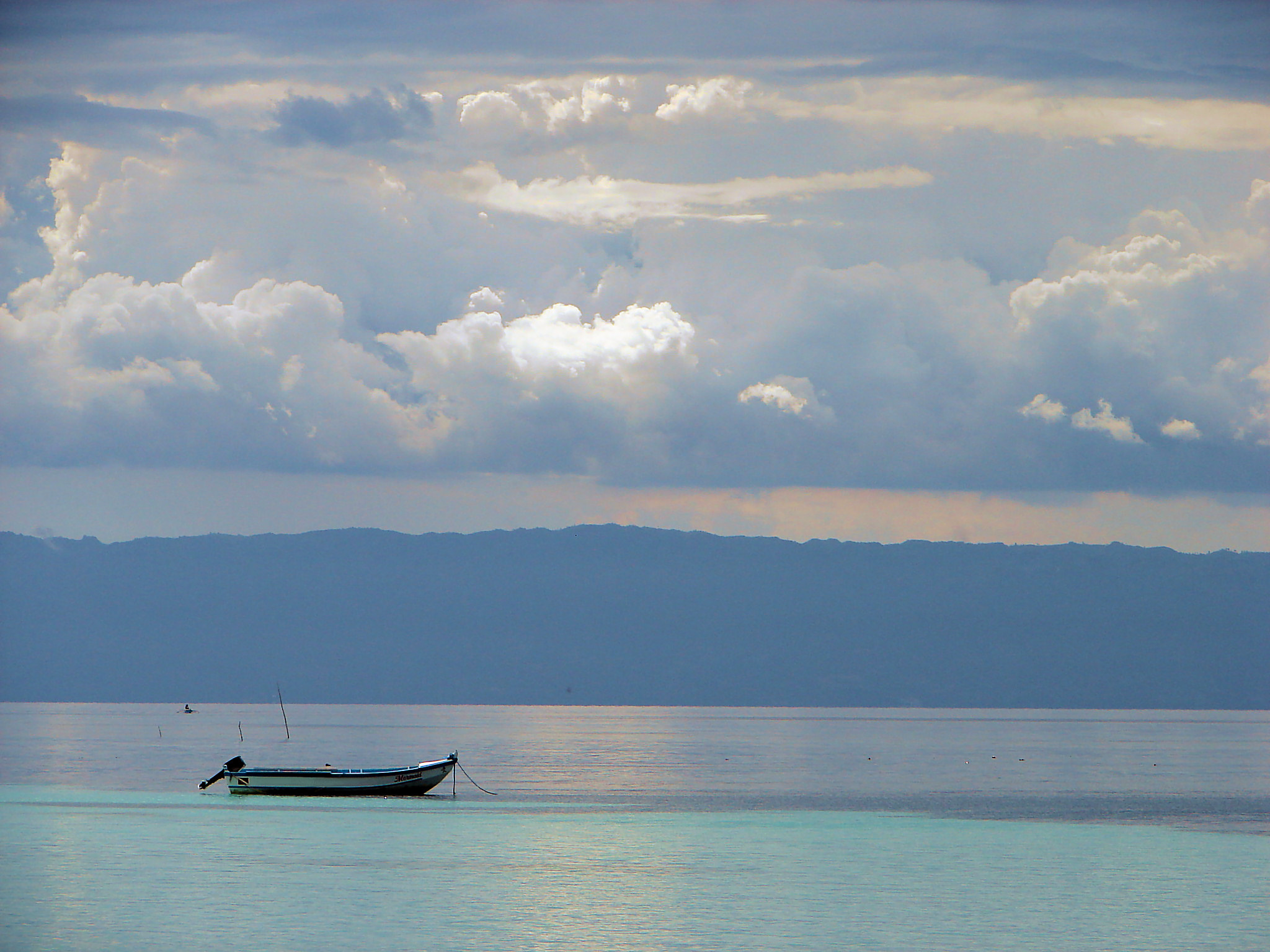
- The strait with Cebu Island in the background

- Location within the Philippines Cebu Strait (Philippines)
- Location: Central Visayas
- Coordinates: 9°49′39″N 123°41′26″E
- Type: strait
- Etymology: Cebu; Bohol
- Part of: Bohol Sea; Camotes Sea

Cebu Strait (Tagalog: Kipot ng Cebú; also Bohol Strait) is a strait in the Central Visayas region in the Philippines.

== Geography ==
The Cebu Strait (and its 3 channels, the Mactan, the Olango, & the Hilutangan) connects the western part of the Bohol Sea with the Camotes Sea, and separates the island provinces of Cebu and Bohol.

== Transport ==
The strait is a major sea-lane connecting Cebu City on the strait's northern end with port cities in the south such as Dumaguete in Negros Oriental and Cagayan de Oro in Northern Mindanao.

Mactan Island, on the northern end of the strait, has Mactan–Cebu International Airport, one of the major airports in the country.

== See also ==
- Canigao Channel - connects the eastern part of the Bohol Sea with the Camotes Sea
- Tañon Strait - separates the islands of Negros and Cebu
