= Mactan =

Island in Cebu province, Philippines

Coordinates: 10°18′N 123°58′E

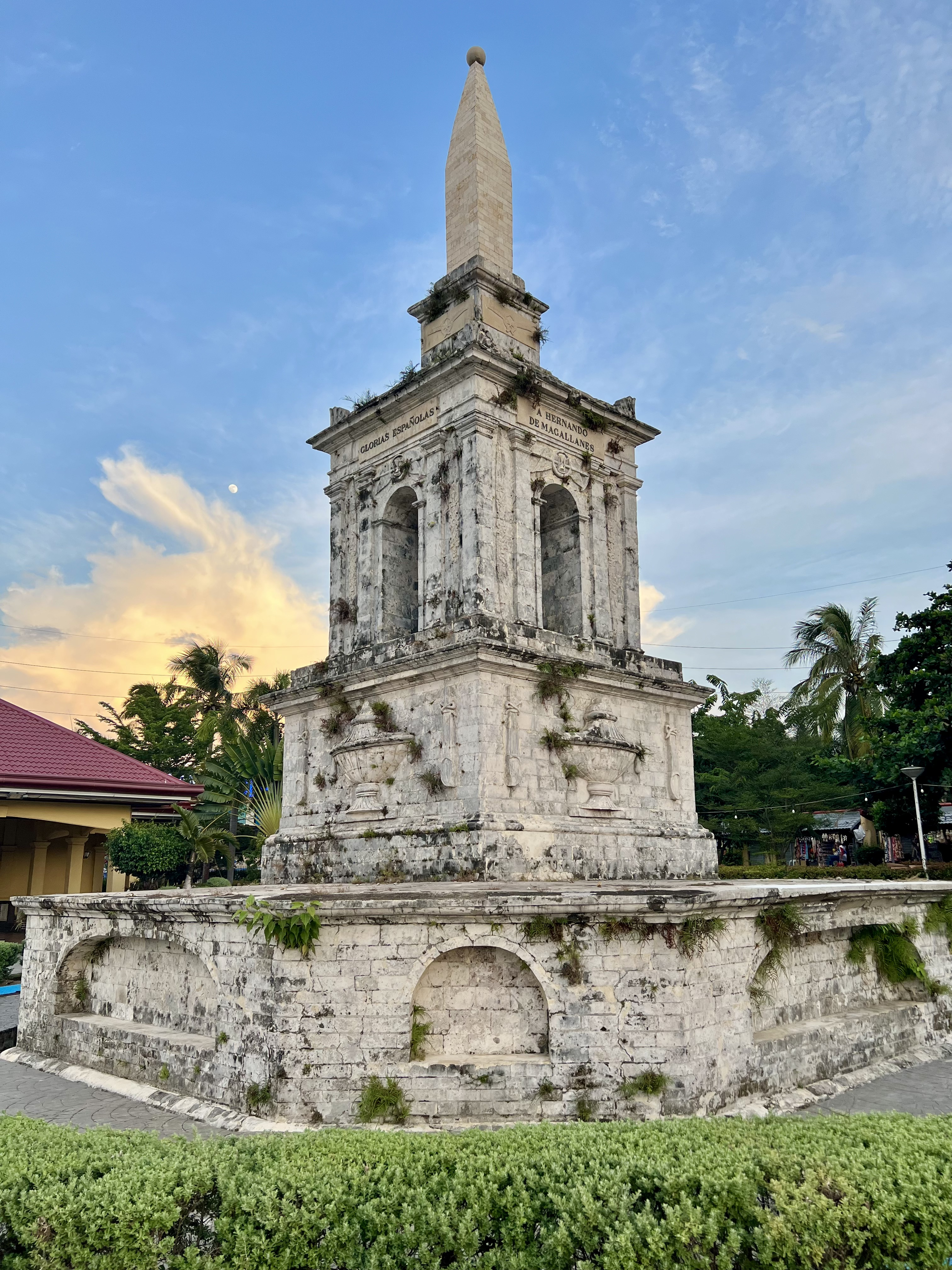
- Magellan monument in Mactan Shrine

- Mactan in red

- Location in Visayas Location in Philippines

Geography
- Archipelago: Visayas
- Adjacent to: Camotes Sea; Cebu Strait
- Area: 65 km^{2} (25 sq mi)
- Highest elevation: 6 m (20 ft)

Administration
- Philippines
- City and Municipality: Lapu-Lapu; Cordova
- Largest settlement: Lapu-Lapu City (pop. 497,813)

Demographics
- Population: 526,620 (2024)
- Pop. density: 8,101/km^{2} (20981/sq mi)
- Ethnic groups: Visayan (Cebuano) and other ethnic groups.

Mactan is a densely populated island located a few kilometers (~1 mile) east of Cebu Island in the Philippines. The island is part of Cebu province and it is divided into the city of Lapu-Lapu and the municipality of Cordova.

The island is separated from Cebu by the Mactan Channel which is presently crossed by three bridges: the Cebu–Cordova Link Expressway (CCLEX), the Mactan–Mandaue Bridge, and the Marcelo Fernan Bridge. The island covers some 65 square kilometres (25 sq mi) and has a population of 526,620 as of 2024, making it the nation's most densely populated island. Along with Olango Island Group, the isles are administered by a city and a municipality covering 75.25 square kilometres (29.05 sq mi).

Mactan–Cebu International Airport is located on the island.

== Etymology ==
The modern name Mactan descended from an earlier form, Manctan. However, evidence of this earlier form is scant as, even as early as the 17th century, the island was already named Mactan. This form is attested in the original copy of the Philippine Declaration of Independence, where Lapu-Lapu was mentioned as the king of "Manktan". This is supported by oral histories, which claim that the name Mactan evolved from the name Mangatang.

The name means "pirate" (lit. "those who lie in wait"), and was acquired during a period where the island's population would prey on passing trade ships on the way to the harbors of Sugbu. The ancient name of the island in precolonial times is Opong, which became the name of the Spanish settlement of Opon (renamed to Lapu-Lapu in 1961).

== History ==
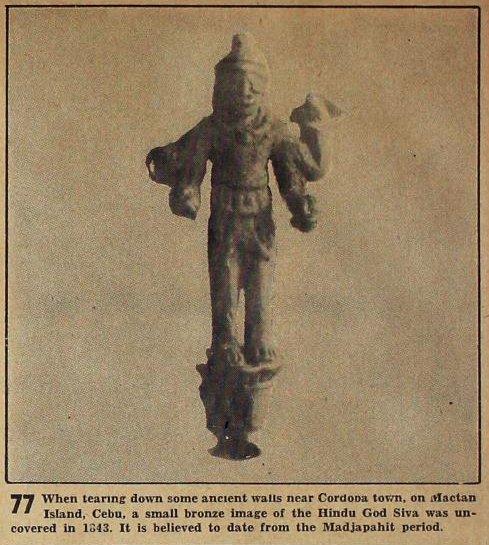
A picture of a Bronze Image of the Hindu god Shiva (lost during World War 2), found in Mactan, demonstrating the area as having been Hindu and Indianized.

The island was already a thriving settlement before being colonized by Spain in the 16th century. It was a strong ally of the Lakanate of Lawan, a prosperous kingdom in Samar. Datu Hadi Iberein ruled the Lakanate of Lawan. He was described by historian William Henry Scott as a "Samar datu by the name of Iberein was rowed out to a Spanish vessel anchored in his harbor in 1543 by oarsmen collared in gold; while wearing on his own person earrings and chains."

Portuguese explorer Ferdinand Magellan arrived on the island in 1521 and became involved in warfare among the kingdoms only to be killed in battle by the warriors of Datu Lapu-Lapu, the sovereign in the island. However, oral tradition also dictates that the island where the Battle of Mactan might have taken place is Poro Island in the northeast instead. The oral tradition is backed by recent archaeological evidence of such a battle taking place in Poro island during the 16th century.

By 1730, the Catholic Augustinian friars established the town of Opon. It was later renamed as the city of Lapu-Lapu by means of Republic Act 3134, signed by Pres. Carlos P. Garcia on June 17, 1961. Congressman Manuel A. Zosa, the representative of the Sixth District of Cebu, sponsored the bill converting the former municipality of Opon into the present day City of Lapu-Lapu.

== Economy ==
Apart from the airport, today the island is known for its industrial factories, which are some of the most successful industrial ventures in the Philippines. Many of them are located at the Mactan Export Processing Zone (MEPZ), an industrial tax-free zone opened in 1979 that includes over 35 business ventures, about 50 percent of which are Japanese-owned.

Also important to the island is its high-class tourism industry and the production of furniture, as well as guitars, ukuleles and other musical instruments.

On April 27, 2024, Marcos with Junard Chan, led the capsule-laying for Megaworld Corporation's PHP1.5-billion Mactan Expo Center project.

== Tourist attractions ==
Being one of the major tourist islands of Cebu, Mactan Island boasts of a diverse collection of tourist spots and attractions. It is a coral island.

== Gallery ==
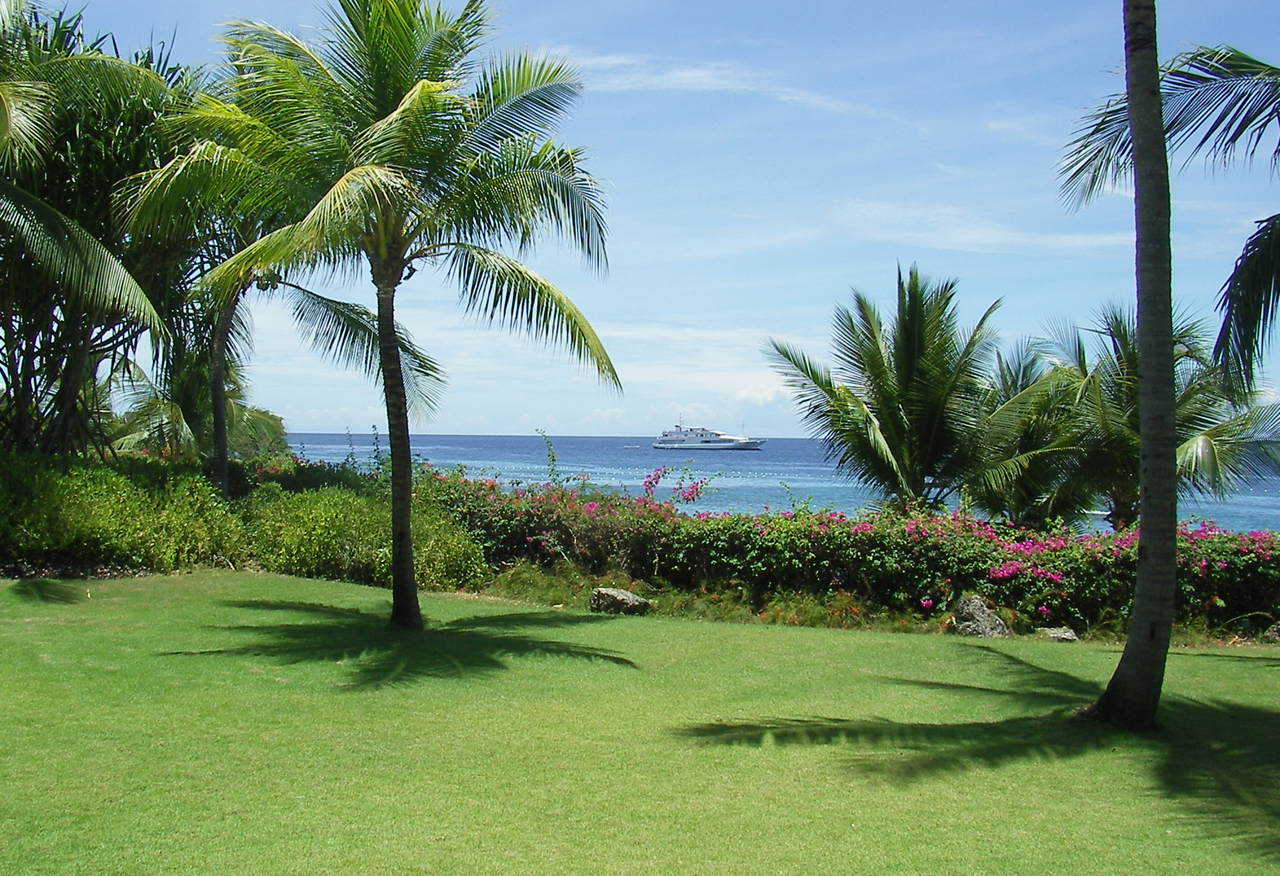
A view from a resort in Mactan where the sun is directly overhead at noon.

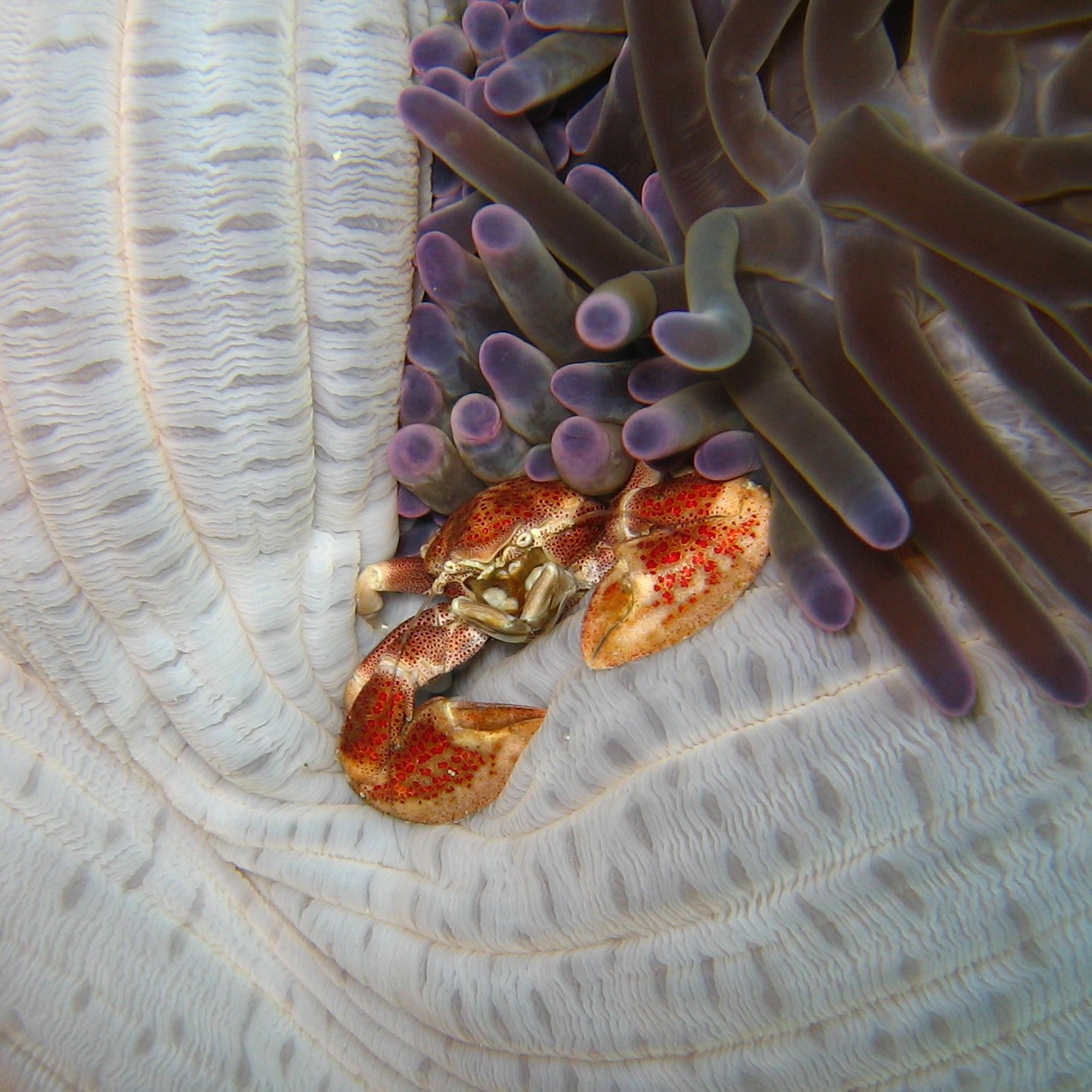
A crab in a sea anemone in Mactan

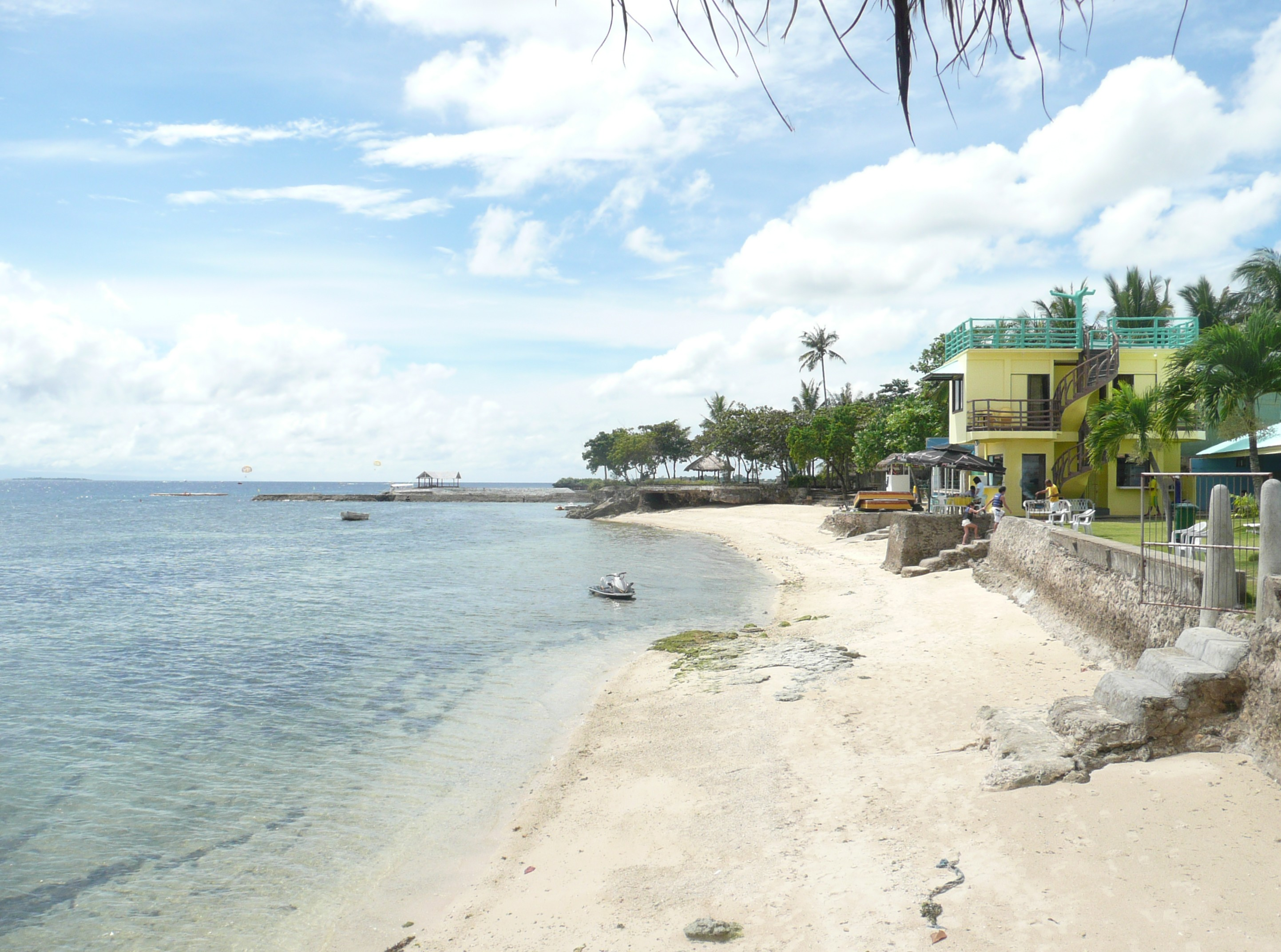
Mactan beach

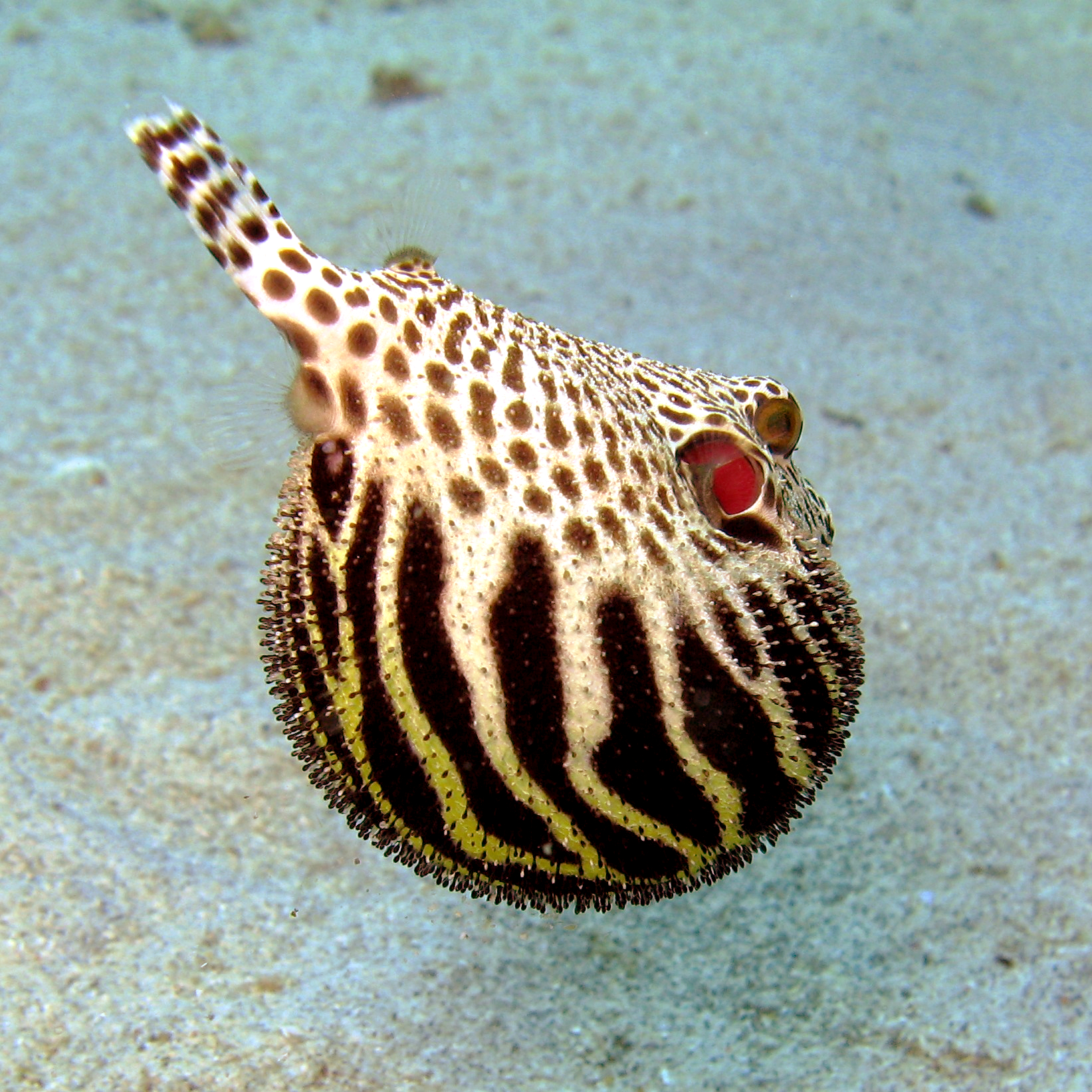
An Arothron stellatus in Mactan

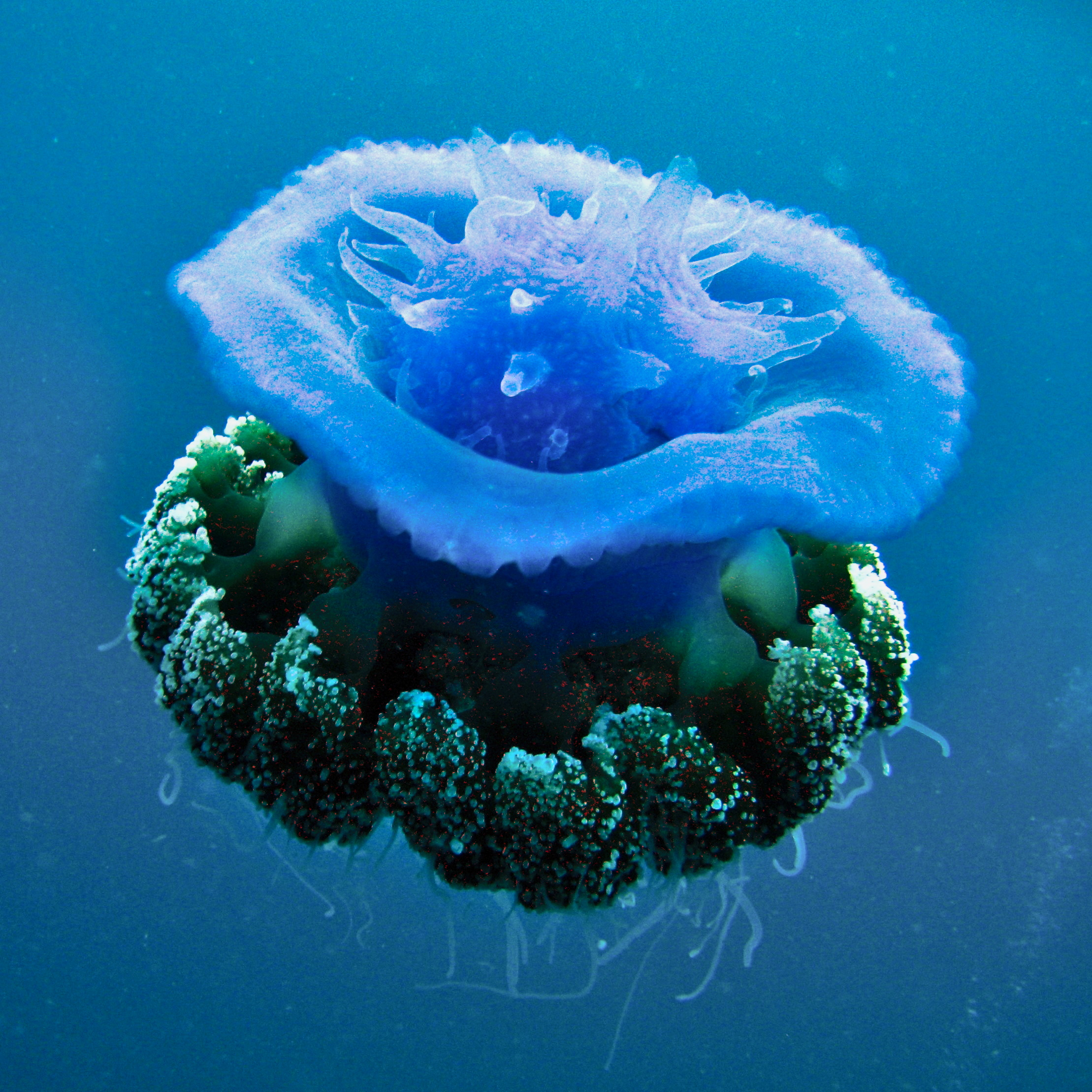
A Cephea jellyfish at Mactan
