= Cebu City Council =

Legislative body in the Philippines

Cebu City Council Sangguniang Panlungsod ng Cebu
- 17th Sangguniang Panlungsod ng Cebu
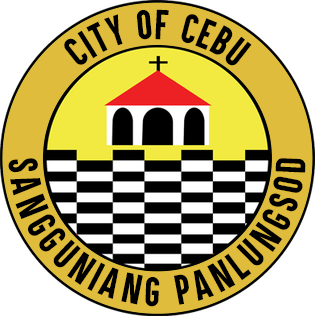
- Seal of the City Council of Cebu

Type
- Type: Unicameral
- Term limits: 3 terms (9 years)

History
- Founded: February 24, 1937

Leadership
- Vice Mayor and Presiding Officer: Tomas Osmeña (Liberal)
- Presiding Officer pro tempore: Philip Zafra (Lakas)
- Majority Leader: Winston Pepito (PFP)
- Minority Leader: Sisinio Andales (Liberal)

Structure
- Seats: 18 councilors (including 2 ex officio members); 1 ex officio presiding officer
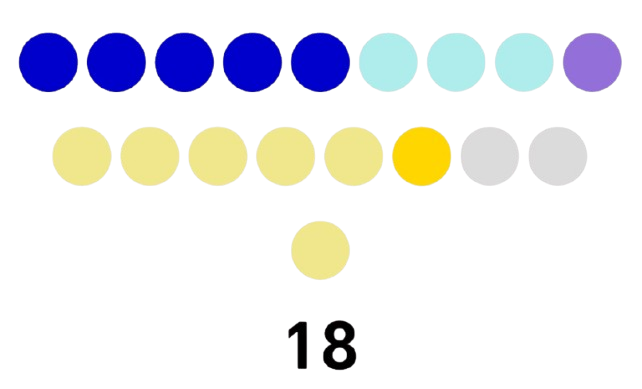
- Political groups: Majority bloc (12): PFP (5); Lakas (3); Aksyon (1); PDP (1); Nonpartisan (2); Minority bloc (6): Liberal (6)
- Length of term: 3 years
- Authority: Cebu City Charter; Local Government Code of the Philippines

Elections
- Voting system: Plurality-at-large voting (16 seats); Indirect elections (2 seats)
- Last election: May 12, 2025
- Next election: May 8, 2028

Meeting place
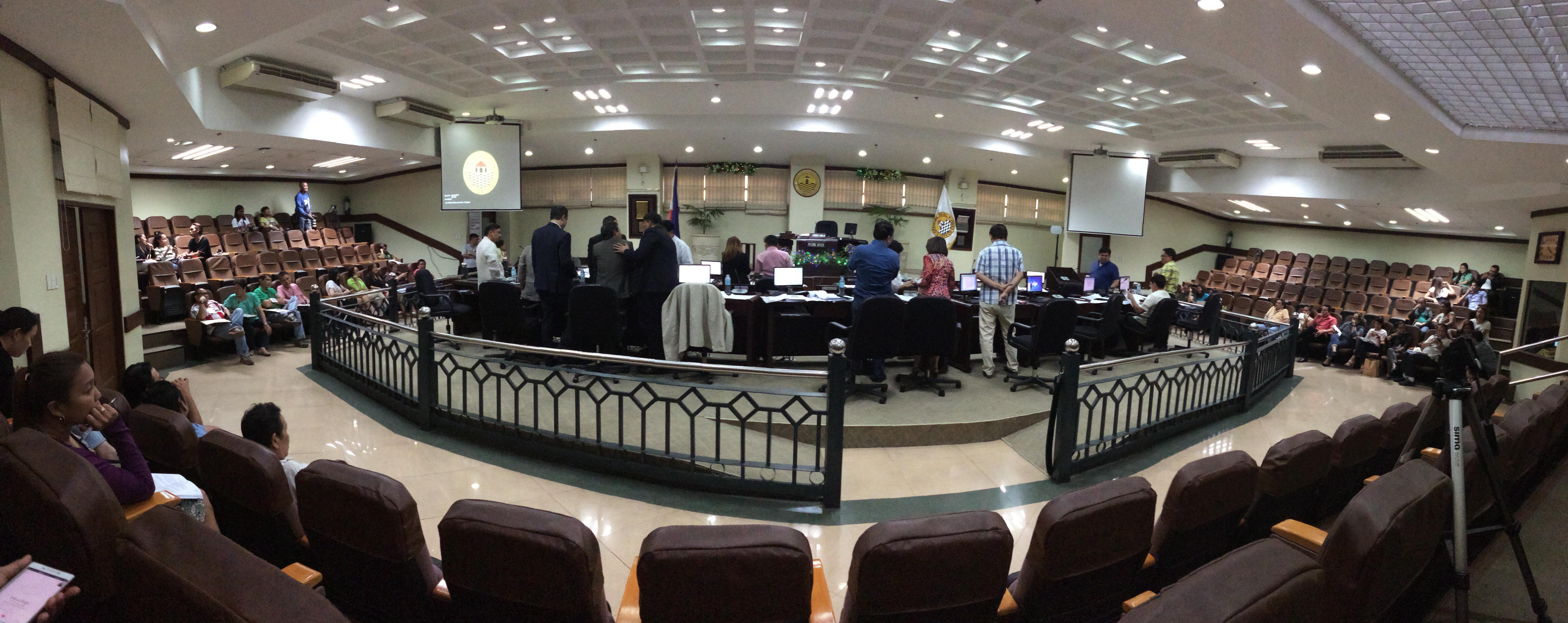
- Doña Eva Macaraeg-Macapagal Session Hall; 4th Floor, Legislative Building; Cebu City Hall

Website
- https://www.cebucity.gov.ph

The Cebu City Council (Filipino: Sangguniang Panlungsod ng Cebu) is the legislature of Cebu City, Philippines. The legislative body is composed of 18 councilors, with 16 councilors elected from Cebu City's two councilor districts and two elected from the ranks of barangay (neighborhood) chairmen and the Sangguniang Kabataan (youth councils). The council's presiding officer is the vice-mayor (elected by the city). The council is responsible for creating laws and ordinances under the jurisdiction of Cebu City. Although the mayor can veto proposed bills, the council can override the veto with a two-thirds supermajority.

== History ==
In 1937, four municipalities (including Cebu) were officially converted into cities. With the largest population and number of registered voters at the time, Cebu City was allocated eight members for its city council. On February 24, 1937, at the promulgation of the Cebu City charter, the eight inaugural members of the council were sworn in: Jose P. Nolasco, Dominador Abella, Diego Cañizares, Leandro Tojong, Manuel Roa, Felipe Pacaña, Regino Mercado and Jose Fortich.

On December 10, 1940, eight members were elected to the council: Leandro A. Tojong, Juan Zamora, Honorato S. Hermosisima, Florencio Urot, Florentino D. Tecson, Ramon U. Abellanosa, Cecilio dela Victoria, and Numeriano Estenzo. Their election was confirmed in Executive Order No. 315, s. 1940, signed on December 28, 1940, by President Manuel Quezon.

The post-war city council was convened on July 1, 1945, and was composed of Honorato S. Hermosisima, Cecilio dela Victoria, Florencio S. Urot, Numeriano G. Estenzo, Eugenio G. Corro, Canuto O. Borromeo, Alfonso S. Frias and Miguel Sanson. On July 5, 1945, Cebu City Ordinance No. 1, "An Ordinance regulating the establishment and maintenance of cockpits in the City of Cebu", was passed; the city's first ordinance, it was also the first cockpit ordinance in the Philippines and was authored by Councilor Cecilio dela Victoria. Another ordinance was Cebu City Ordinance No. 4, "An Ordinance Appropriating Funds for the necessary expenses of the Government of the City of Cebu during the period from July first Nineteen Hundred Forty-Five to September Thirtieth Nineteen Hundred Forty-Five, and for other purposes". In this appropriation ordinance, the total per diems for the eight council members was ₱2,680.

== Seat ==
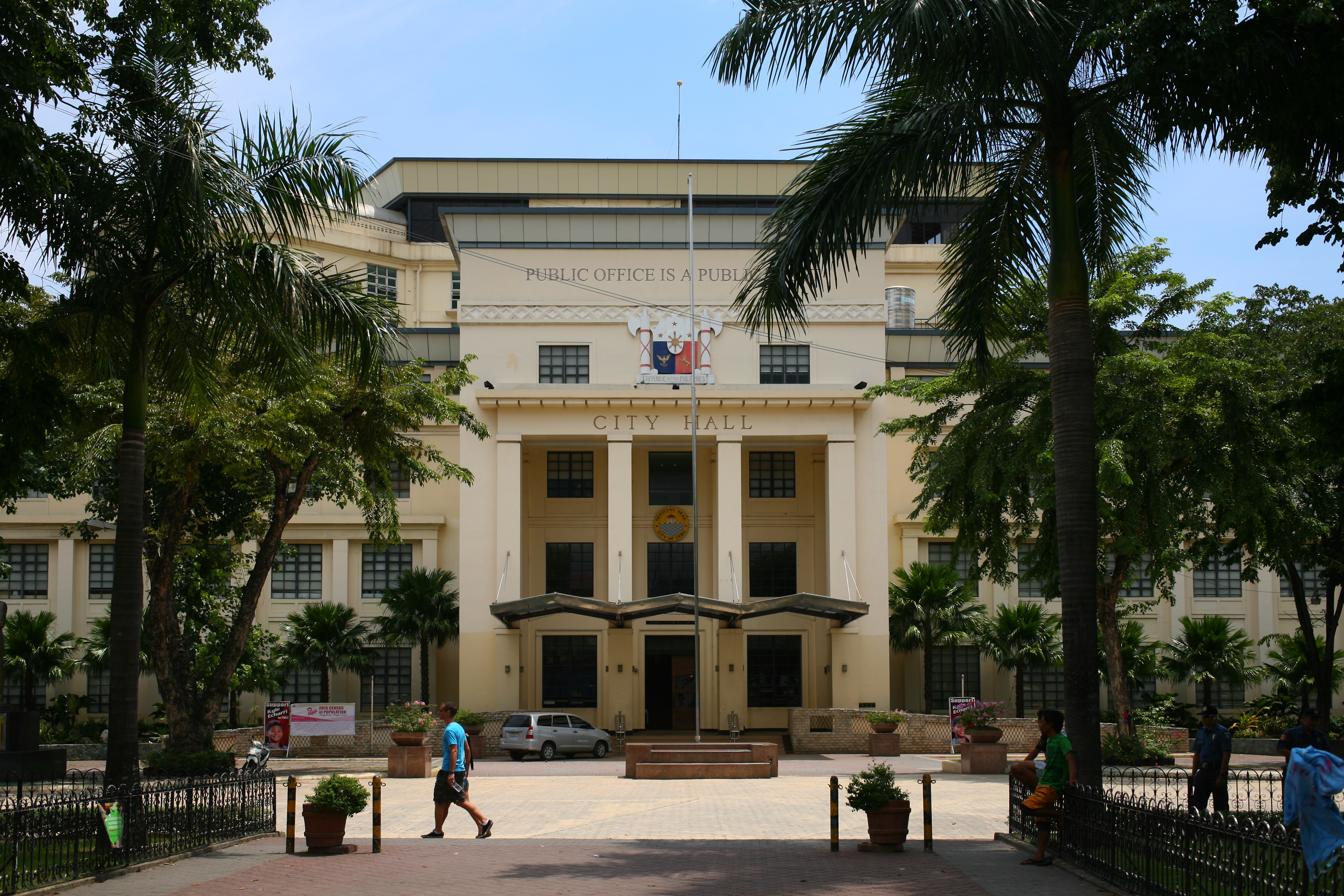
Legislative building of the Cebu City Hall

The council sits at Cebu City Hall, meeting in the Doña Eva Macaraeg-Macapagal Session Hall of the Cebu City Legislative Building (CCLB). The renovated CCLB was inaugurated on July 24, 2008, by President Gloria Macapagal Arroyo, assisted by Cebu City Mayor Tomas Osmeña and Vice Mayor Michael Rama. Renovations cost ₱120 million, of which ₱15 million came from the Philippine Tourism Authority (now TIEZA).

The session hall was named for Eva Macaraeg-Macapagal, the mother of former President Gloria Macapagal Arroyo, second wife of former President Diosdado Macapagal, and ninth First Lady of the Philippines.

During its September 3, 2019, session, the city council approved an ordinance institutionalizing the conduct of regular and special sessions outside of its current session hall. These sessions would also be aired live on the official Facebook page of the Cebu City's Public Information Office (PIO).

== Membership and organization ==
Each of Cebu City's two congressional districts elects eight members of the council. In plurality-at-large voting, a voter may vote for up to eight candidates, and the candidates with the eight highest numbers of votes are elected. Regular elections to the city council are synchronized with other national and elections in the country, which have been held on the second Monday of May every third year since 1992.

Punong Barangays and Sangguniang Kabataan (SK) Chairpersons from each of the city's 80 barangays, through the Cebu City chapters of the Liga ng mga Barangay (LnB) and SK Federation, respectively, each elect an ex officio representative to the council separately from the regular local elections, bringing the council's total membership to 18. The current term of Barangay and SK officials is set to expire on December 1, 2026.

The vice mayor presides over sessions of the city council and can only vote in the event of a tie, with the presiding officer pro tempore substituting when the vice mayor yields the chair to participate in council debates, and the next highest-ranked councilor (starting with the first-ranked) taking over as acting vice mayor during the vice mayor's absences. The vice mayor also serves as the council's chief administrative officer, appointing and overseeing the council's employees. The majority and minority leaders lead their respective council blocs, with the majority bloc deciding the leadership of council committees.

Each councilor has their own office and staff. The administrative and operational work of the council as a whole is assisted by a secretariat led by the nonvoting Secretary to the Sangguniang Panlungsod, who is appointed by the vice mayor.

=== Leadership ===
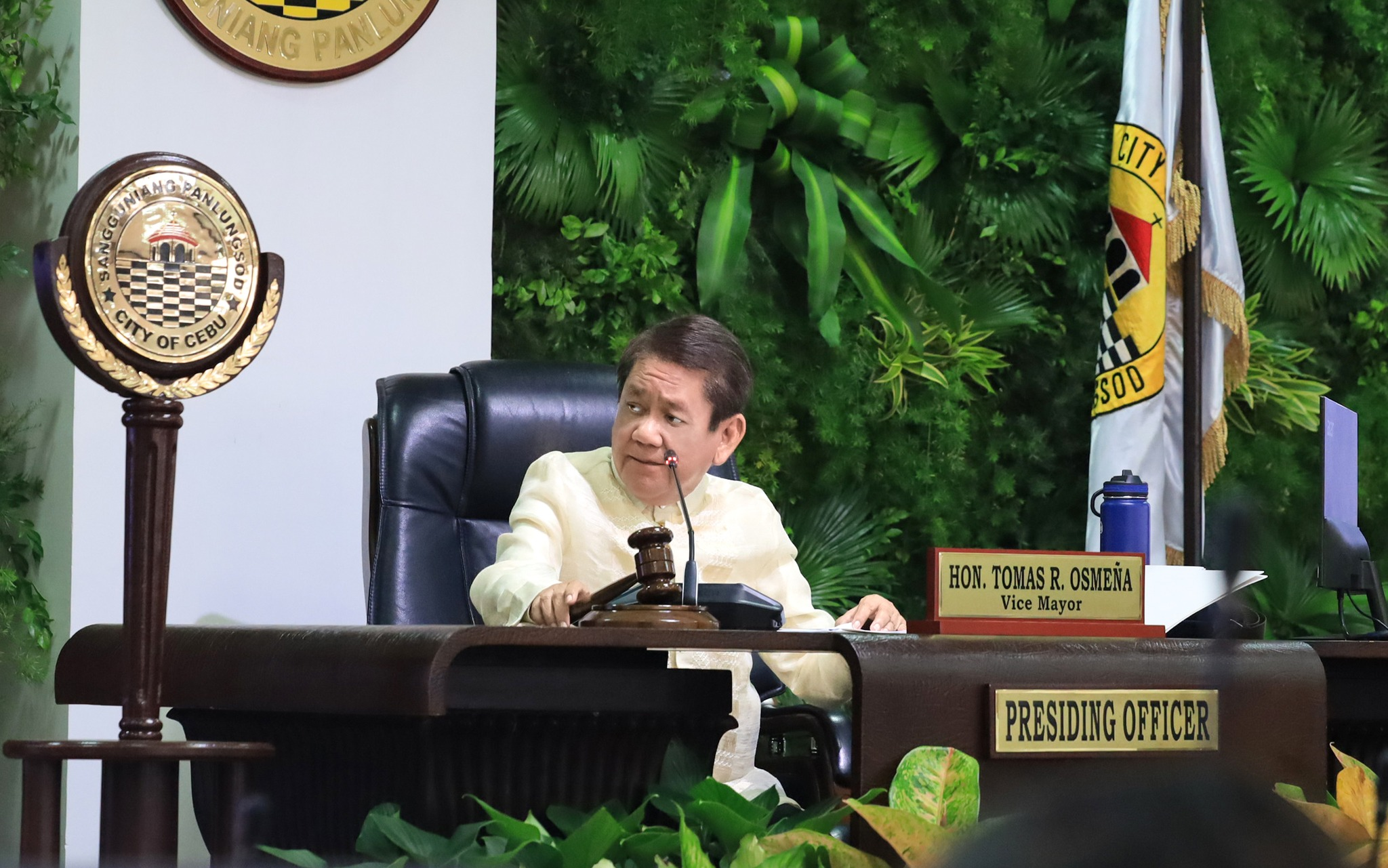
Vice Mayor Tomas Osmeña presiding over the Cebu City Council on July 8, 2025

| Position | Officer | Party |
|---|---|---|
| Presiding officer | Vice Mayor Tomas R. Osmeña | BOPK |
| Presiding officer pro tempore | Philip S. Zafra | BARUG |
| Majority leader | Winston C. Pepito | KUSUG |
| 1st assistant majority leader | Joel C. Garganera | KUSUG |
| 2nd assistant majority leader | Pancrasio "Francis" I. Esparis | BARUG |
| Minority leader | Sisinio "Bebs" M. Andales | BOPK |
| Assistant minority leader | Alvin B. Arcilla | BOPK |
| Secretary (Note: Appointed by the vice mayor from the city's employees) | Charisse L. Piramide | Nonpartisan |

=== Members (2025–2028) ===
| Councilor | Party | | District | Terms | | | Bloc |
| Councilor | Local | National | District | No. | Started | Ends | Bloc |
|---|---|---|---|---|---|---|---|
| Abella-Cellona, Michelle E. | BOPK | Liberal | South | 1st | June 30, 2025 | June 30, 2028 | Minority |
| Abellanosa, Jose Lorenzo R. | BOPK | Liberal | South | 2nd | June 30, 2025 | June 30, 2028 | Minority |
| Alcover, Pastor Jr. M. | KUSUG | PFP | North | 2nd | June 30, 2025 | June 30, 2028 | Majority |
| Andales, Sisinio "Bebs" M. | BOPK | Liberal | North | 1st | June 30, 2025 | June 30, 2028 | Minority |
| Archival, Nyza "Nice" C. | BOPK | Liberal | North | 1st | June 30, 2025 | June 30, 2028 | Minority |
| Arcilla, Alvin B. | BOPK | Liberal | North | 1st | June 30, 2025 | June 30, 2028 | Minority |
| Eran, Harry R. | BARUG | Lakas–CMD | South | 1st | June 30, 2025 | June 30, 2028 | Majority |
| Esparis, Pancrasio "Francis" I. | BARUG | Lakas–CMD | South | 2nd | June 30, 2025 | June 30, 2028 | Majority |
| Garganera, Joel C. | KUSUG | PFP | North | 4th (Note: Garganera ran for Councilor in 2025, arguing that the 15-day delay in his proclamation after winning his second consecutive term in 2019 constituted an interruption to the three-term limit. He is currently facing legal challenges from an April 3, 2025 petition seeking to declare Garganera's 2025 candidacy and victory in violation of the three-term limit under the 1987 Constitution and the Local Government Code.) | June 30, 2025 | June 30, 2028 | Majority |
| Go, Harold Kendrick Y. | KUSUG | PFP | North | 1st | June 30, 2025 | June 30, 2028 | Majority |
| Labella, Edgardo II "Jaypee" N. | KUSUG | PFP | North | 2nd | June 30, 2025 | June 30, 2028 | Majority |
| Labra, Pablo II "Paul" G. | BOPK | Liberal | South | 1st | June 30, 2025 | June 30, 2028 | Minority |
| Pepito, Winston C. | KUSUG | PFP | North | 1st | June 30, 2025 | June 30, 2028 | Majority |
| Rama, Mikel F. | BARUG | PDP | South | 1st | June 30, 2025 | June 30, 2028 | Majority |
| Tumulak, David "Dave" F. | KUSUG | Aksyon | South | 1st | June 30, 2025 | June 30, 2028 | Majority |
| Zafra, Phillip S. | BARUG | Lakas–CMD | South | 3rd | June 30, 2025 | June 30, 2028 | Majority |
| Ong, Franklyn O. (Barangay Kasambagan) | Nonpartisan, allied with BARUG (Note: Despite being officially nonpartisan as a barangay official, Ong has been allied with BARUG since his transfer from BOPK in 2024.) | | LNB (Note: The President of the Liga ng mga Barangay (LNB, also known as the Association of Barangay Councils or ABC) in Cebu City is an ex-officio member of the Sangguniang Panlungsod.) | 2nd (Note: The LnB President's terms depend on the elections and term limits for Barangay and SK officials, rather than on the local elections. Despite the new membership of the rest of the council, the 2025 local elections do not count as a new term for its two ex-officio members; Ong was first elected LnB President in 2018 and re-elected following the 2023 Barangay and SK Elections, and is thus counted as being on his second term despite serving on what would be his fourth council.) | July 30, 2018 | December 1, 2026 | Majority |
| Jakosalem, Rhea Mae P. (Barangay Pari-an) | Nonpartisan, allied with BARUG (Note: Despite being officially nonpartisan as an SK official, Jakosalem has been allied with BARUG since her election in 2023.) | | SK (Note: The President of the Sangguniang Kabataan Federation (SKF) in Cebu City is an ex-officio member of the Sangguniang Panlungsod.) | 1st (Note: The SK Federation President's terms depend on the elections and term limits for Barangay and SK officials, rather than on the local elections. Despite the new membership of the rest of the council, the 2025 local elections do not count as a new term for its two ex-officio members, hence Jakosalem still serving her first term in the new council.) | November 30, 2023 (Note: Succeeded Jessica Resch whose term concluded on November 30, 2023, following the 2023 Philippine barangay and Sangguniang Kabataan elections. She was elected as the president of the Sangguniang Kabataan Federation (SKF) in Cebu City on November 14, 2023.) | December 1, 2026 | Majority |

Summary by party (local)
| Party | Total | % |
|---|---|---|
| BOPK | 6 | 33.3% |
| KUSUG | 6 | 33.3% |
| BARUG | 4 | 22.2% |
| Nonpartisan | 2 | 11.1% |
| Total | 18 | 100.0% |

Summary (local)
| Presiding officer | | | | | | | | |
| Seats | 1 | 2 | 3 | 4 | 5 | 6 | 7 | 8 |
| 1st (North) | | | | | | | | |
| 2nd (South) | | | | | | | | |
| Ex officio | | | | | | | | |

=== Blocs ===
The council is divided into the majority and minority blocs. Since July 8, 2025, the majority bloc is composed of councilors who won in the 2025 elections under KUSUG (with PFP and Aksyon as their national parties) and BARUG (with PDP and Lakas). The minority bloc is composed of councilors aligned with BOPK–LP.

==== 2017 definition of simple majority ====
In an omnibus resolution, Majority Floor Leader James Anthony Cuenco and the BARUG Team Rama council members moved to declare all positions in the Council vacant (including the presiding officer pro tempore, majority floor leader, 1st assistant majority floor leader, 2nd assistant majority floor leader and the chairs and members of all standing and ad hoc committees) on June 20, 2017. This was in response to the change in affiliation of BARUG Team Rama councilors David Tumulak, Nendell Hanz Abella, and Jerry Guardo to BOPK, making it the council's majority bloc. For several weeks, no committee chairs were elected because of disagreements about what constituted a simple majority. The presiding officer, Vice Mayor Edgardo Labella, met with Councilors Margarita Osmeña and James Anthony Cuenco and they agreed to seek the opinion of the Department of the Interior and Local Government (DILG).

July 24, 2017, DILG opinion stated that the City Council presiding officer should not be included in the count determining the council's majority bloc, citing the August 3, 2016 Supreme Court ruling in Tobias Javier vs. Rhodora Cadiao, et al.: "The Vice Governor, as the Presiding Officer, shall be considered a part of the SP for purposes of ascertaining if a quorum exists. In determining the number which constitutes the majority vote, the Vice Governor is excluded. The Vice Governor's right to vote is merely contingent and arises only when there is a tie to break." The vice governor is the presiding officer of a provincial board, and the vice mayor is the presiding officer of a city (or municipal) council.

== Powers, duties, and functions ==
The council, as the city's legislative body, is mandated by the Local Government Code of 1991 to enact ordinances; approve resolutions; appropriate funds for the welfare of the city and its inhabitants (pursuant to Section 16 of the Local Government Code), and ensure the proper exercise of the city's corporate powers (as provided under Section 22 of the Local Government Code). It has the following duties and functions:

- Approving ordinances and passing resolutions necessary for an efficient and effective city government;
- Generating and maximizing the use of resources and revenue for the city's development plans, program objectives and priorities as provided for under Section 18 of the Local Government Code, with particular attention to agricultural and industrial development and citywide growth and progress;
- Enacting ordinances granting franchises and authorizing the issuance of permits or licenses, subject to Book II of the Local Government Code;
- Regulating activities related to land use, buildings, and other structures in the city to promote the general welfare of its inhabitants;
- Approving ordinances which ensure the efficient delivery of basic services and facilities as provided under Section 17 of the Local Government Code; and
- Exercising other powers and performing other duties and functions as prescribed by law.

== Committees ==
=== 2025–present ===
There are currently 27 standing committees as of July 8, 2025:

| Committee | Party | | Chair | Bloc |
| Committee | Local | National | Chair | Bloc |
|---|---|---|---|---|
| Agriculture and Rural Development | KUSUG | PFP | Jun Alcover Jr. | Majority |
| Animal Welfare | BARUG | Lakas–CMD | Philip Zafra | Majority |
| Barangay Affairs | Nonpartisan | | Franklyn Ong (LnB) | Majority |
| Budget and Finance | KUSUG | Aksyon | Dave Tumulak | Majority |
| Disaster Risk Reduction Management, Safety and Climate Change Adaptation | KUSUG | Aksyon | Dave Tumulak | Majority |
| Education, Science and Technology | Nonpartisan | | Franklyn Ong (LnB) | Majority |
| Environmental Natural Resources, Energy and Other Utilities | KUSUG | PFP | Joel Garganera | Majority |
| Games and Amusements | KUSUG | PFP | Jun Alcover Jr. | Majority |
| Health, Hospital Services and Sanitation | KUSUG | Aksyon | Dave Tumulak | Majority |
| House Rules and Oversight | BARUG | Lakas–CMD | Philip Zafra | Majority |
| Housing | BARUG | PDP | Mikel Rama | Majority |
| Information and Communications Technology | KUSUG | PFP | Edgardo Labella II | Majority |
| Infrastructure | KUSUG | PFP | Edgardo Labella II | Majority |
| Labor, Employment, Cooperative and Livelihood | BARUG | PDP | Mikel Rama | Majority |
| Laws, Ordinances and Styling | BARUG | PDP | Mikel Rama | Majority |
| Markets | KUSUG | PFP | Jun Alcover Jr. | Majority |
| Public Order | BARUG | Lakas–CMD | Phillip Zafra | Majority |
| Public Services | BOPK | Liberal | Paul Labra II | Minority |
| Scholarship Program | KUSUG | PFP | Winston Pepito | Majority |
| Sister Cities Relations and Big Brother Program | BOPK | Liberal | Nyza Archival | Minority |
| Social Services | BARUG | Lakas–CMD | Pancrasio Esparis | Majority |
| Tourism, Arts and Culture | BOPK | Liberal | Nyza Archival | Minority |
| Trade, Commerce and Entrepreneurship | KUSUG | PFP | Harold Go | Majority |
| Transportation and Communication | KUSUG | PFP | Winston Pepito | Majority |
| Urban Planning | KUSUG | PFP | Harold Go | Majority |
| Women, LGBTQ and Family Affairs | KUSUG | PFP | Winston Pepito | Majority |
| Youth and Sports Development | Nonpartisan | | Rhea Mae Jakosalem (SK) | Majority |

=== 2020–2022 ===
New officers were elected on July 29, 2020. Ad hoc committees for the Cebu City Medical Center and for the online session were also created.

| Committee | Party | Chair | Bloc |
|---|---|---|---|
| Agriculture and Rural Development | PDP–Laban | Raymond Alvin Garcia | Majority |
| Barangay Affairs | Nonpartisan | Franklyn Ong | Minority |
| Budget and Finance | PDP–Laban | Raymond Alvin Garcia | Majority |
| Cebu City Medical Center (Ad hoc) | UNA | Vice Mayor Michael Rama | Majority |
| Disaster Risk Reduction Management, Safety and Climate Change Adaptation | Nacionalista | David Tumulak | Majority |
| Education, Science and Technology | UNA | Vice Mayor Michael Rama | Majority |
| Environment and Natural Resources | PDP–Laban | Joel Garganera | Majority |
| Games and Amusements | PDP–Laban | Donaldo Hontiveros | Majority |
| Health, Hospital Services and Sanitation | UNA | Vice Mayor Michael Rama | Majority |
| House Rules and Oversight | PDP–Laban | Phillip Zafra | Majority |
| Housing | PDP–Laban | Raymond Alvin Garcia | Majority |
| Information and Communications Technology | PDP–Laban | Eduardo Rama Jr. | Majority |
| Infrastructure | LDP | Jerry Guardo | Majority |
| Labor, Employment, Cooperative and Livelihood | PDP–Laban | Prisca Niña Mabatid | Majority |
| Laws, Ordinances and Styling | PDP–Laban | Raymond Alvin Garcia | Majority |
| Markets | PDP–Laban | Renato Osmeña Jr. | Majority |
| Online Session (Ad hoc) | | TBD | TBD |
| Public Order | PDP–Laban | Phillip Zafra | Majority |
| Public Services | PDP–Laban | Eduardo Rama Jr. | Majority |
| Scholarship Program | PDP–Laban | Donaldo Hontiveros | Majority |
| Sister Cities Relations and Big Brother Program | PDP–Laban | Raymond Alvin Garcia | Majority |
| Social Services | PDP–Laban | Eduardo Rama Jr. | Majority |
| Tourism, Arts and Culture | PDP–Laban | Prisca Niña Mabatid | Majority |
| Trade, Commerce and Entrepreneurship | PDP–Laban | Renato Osmeña Jr. | Majority |
| Transportation, Communication, Energy and Other Utilities | PDP–Laban | James Anthony Cuenco | Majority |
| Urban Planning | PDP–Laban | Joel Garganera | Majority |
| Women and Family Affairs | PDP–Laban | Prisca Niña Mabatid | Majority |
| Youth and Sports Development | Nonpartisan | Jessica Resch | Minority |

=== 2019–2020 ===
There were 26 standing committees as of July 14, 2019:

| Committee | Party | Chair | Bloc |
|---|---|---|---|
| Agriculture and Rural Development | PDP–Laban | Raymond Alvin Garcia | Majority |
| Barangay Affairs | Nonpartisan | Franklyn Ong | Minority |
| Budget and Finance | PDP–Laban | Raymond Alvin Garcia | Majority |
| Disaster Risk Reduction Management, Safety and Climate Change Adaptation | Nacionalista | David Tumulak | Majority |
| Education, Science and Technology | PDP–Laban | Vacant | |
| Environment and Natural Resources | UNA | Vice Mayor Michael Rama | Majority |
| Games and Amusements | PDP–Laban | Donaldo Hontiveros | Majority |
| Health, Hospital Services and Sanitation | UNA | Vice Mayor Michael Rama | Majority |
| House Rules and Oversight | PDP–Laban | Phillip Zafra | Majority |
| Housing | PDP–Laban | Raymond Alvin Garcia | Majority |
| Information and Communications Technology | PDP–Laban | Eduardo Rama Jr. | Majority |
| Infrastructure | LDP | Jerry Guardo | Majority |
| Labor, Employment, Cooperative and Livelihood | LDP | Jerry Guardo | Majority |
| Laws, Ordinances and Styling | PDP–Laban | Raymond Alvin Garcia | Majority |
| Markets | PDP–Laban | Renato Osmeña Jr. | Majority |
| PAGCOR Funds and Gaming Licenses (Ad hoc) | PDP–Laban | Renato Osmeña Jr. | Majority |
| Public Order | PDP–Laban | Phillip Zafra | Majority |
| Public Services | PDP–Laban | Eduardo Rama Jr. | Majority |
| Scholarship Program | PDP–Laban | Donaldo Hontiveros | Majority |
| Sister Cities Relations and Big Brother Program | UNA | Vice Mayor Michael Rama | Majority |
| Social Services | PDP–Laban | Eduardo Rama Jr. | Majority |
| Tourism, Arts and Culture | UNA | Vice Mayor Michael Rama | Majority |
| Trade, Commerce and Entrepreneurship | PDP–Laban | Renato Osmeña Jr. | Majority |
| Transportation, Communication, Energy and Other Utilities | PDP–Laban | Vacant | |
| Urban Planning | PDP–Laban | Phillip Zafra | Majority |
| Women and Family Affairs | PDP–Laban | Prisca Niña Mabatid | Majority |
| Youth and Sports Development | Nonpartisan | Jessica Resch | Minority |

== Past councils ==
=== 2022–2025, 16th SP ===
Members of the 16th Sangguniang Panlungsod (2022–2025)
| Councilor | Party | | District | Terms | | | Bloc |
| Councilor | Local | National | District | No. | Started | Ends | Bloc |
|---|---|---|---|---|---|---|---|
| Abellanosa, Jose Lorenzo R. | BOPK | LDP | South | 1st | June 30, 2022 | June 30, 2025 | Minority |
| Alcover, Pastor Jr. M. | BARUG | PDP | North | 1 | June 30, 2022 | June 30, 2025 | Majority |
| Archival, Nestor D. | BOPK | LDP | North | 2 | June 30, 2019 | June 30, 2025 | Minority |
| Cuenco, James Anthony R. | BARUG | PDP | South | 1 | September 15, 2020 (Note: Councilor James Anthony Cuenco was nominated to succeed his father, Antonio Cuenco, who died on June 27, 2020.) | June 30, 2025 | Majority |
| Delos Santos, Mary Ann C. | BOPK | LDP | North | 1 | June 30, 2022 | June 30, 2025 | Minority |
| Esparis, Pancrasio I. | BARUG | PDP | South | 1 | June 30, 2022 | June 30, 2025 | Majority |
| Garganera, Joel C. | BARUG | Independent (Note: Councilors Garganera, Hontiveros, and Zafra ran as independents but are allied with BARUG.) | North | 3 | June 30, 2016 | June 30, 2025 | Majority |
| Gealon, Rey M. | BARUG | PDP | South | 1 | June 30, 2022 | June 30, 2025 | Majority |
| Guardo, Jerry L. | BARUG | PDP | North | 3 | June 30, 2016 | June 30, 2025 | Majority |
| Hontiveros, Donaldo C. | BARUG | Independent | South | 1st | June 30, 2022 | June 30, 2025 | Majority |
| Labella, Edgardo II N. | BARUG | PDP | North | 1st | June 30, 2022 | June 30, 2025 | Majority |
| Osmeña, Renato Jr. Z. | BARUG | PDP | South | 2nd | December 6, 2017 (Note: Osmeña was appointed by President Rodrigo Duterte to finish Councilor Nendell Hanz Abella's term when Abella was appointed as a commissioner representing the workers' sector of the seventh division of the National Labor Relations Commission (NLRC).) | June 30, 2025 | Majority |
| Pesquera, Jocelyn G. | BARUG | PDP | South | 1 | February 10, 2022 (Note: Pesquera was named as the replacement of Councilor Donaldo Hontiveros as the latter became vice mayor.) | June 30, 2025 | Majority |
| Wenceslao, Noel Eleuterio G. | BARUG | PDP | North | 1st | June 30, 2022 | June 30, 2025 | Majority |
| Young, Joy Augustus G. | BOPK | LDP | North | 3rd | June 30, 2016 | June 30, 2025 | Minority |
| Zafra, Phillip S. | BARUG | Independent | South | 2nd | June 30, 2019 | June 30, 2025 | Majority |
| Ong, Franklyn O. | Nonpartisan, allied with BARUG (Note: Despite being officially nonpartisan as a barangay official, Ong has been allied with BARUG since his transfer from BOPK in 2024.) | | LNB (Note: The President of the Liga ng mga Barangay (LNB, also known as the Association of Barangay Councils or ABC) in Cebu City is an ex-officio member of the Sangguniang Panlungsod.) | 1st | July 30, 2018 | December 1, 2026 | Minority |
| Jakosalem, Rhea Mae P. | Nonpartisan, allied with BARUG (Note: Despite being officially nonpartisan as an SK official, Jakosalem has been allied with BARUG since her election in 2023.) | | SK (Note: The President of the Sangguniang Kabataan Federation (SKF) in Cebu City is an ex-officio member of the Sangguniang Panlungsod.) | 1st | November 30, 2023 (Note: Succeeded Jessica Resch whose term concluded on November 30, 2023, following the 2023 Philippine barangay and Sangguniang Kabataan elections. She was elected as the president of the Sangguniang Kabataan Federation (SKF) in Cebu City on November 14, 2023.) | December 1, 2026 | |

Summary by party (national)
| Party | Total | % |
|---|---|---|
| PDP | 9 | 50% |
| LDP | 4 | 22.2% |
| Independent | 3 | 16.7% |
| Nonpartisan | 2 | 11.1% |
| Total | 18 | 100% |

Summary (national)
| Presiding officer | | | | | | | | |
| Seats | 1 | 2 | 3 | 4 | 5 | 6 | 7 | 8 |
| 1st (North) | | | | | | | | |
| 2nd (South) | | | | | | | | |
| Ex officio | | | | | | | | |

Summary by party (local)
| Party | Total | % |
|---|---|---|
| Partido Barug | 9 | 50% |
| BOPK | 4 | 22.2% |
| Independent | 3 | 16.7% |
| Nonpartisan | 2 | 11.1% |
| Total | 18 | 100% |

Summary (local)
| Presiding officer | | | | | | | | |
| Seats | 1 | 2 | 3 | 4 | 5 | 6 | 7 | 8 |
| 1st (North) | | | | | | | | |
| 2nd (South) | | | | | | | | |
| Ex officio | | | | | | | | |

=== 2019-2022, 15th SP ===
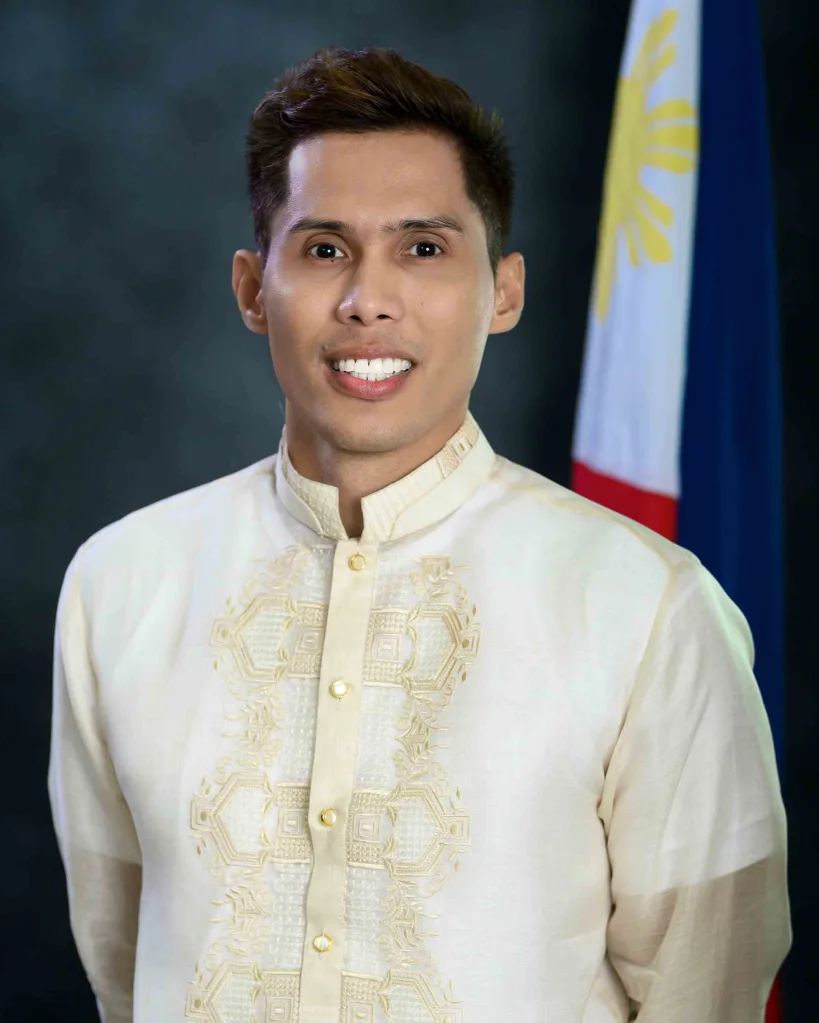
Donaldo "Dondon" C. Hontiveros, presiding officer of 15th Sangguniang Panlungsod after Rama ascended to mayor in 2021

Majority of the councilors in the 15th council came from BARUG.

- Michael L. Rama (presiding officer; assumed by Donaldo Hontiveros on November 20, 2021)
- Nestor D. Archival (BOPK)
- James Anthony R. Cuenco (BARUG)
- Alvin M. Dizon (BOPK)
- Eugenio "Jun" F. Gabuya Jr. (BOPK)
- Raymond Alvin N. Garcia (BARUG)
- Joel C. Garganera (BARUG)
- Jerry L. Guardo (ran under BOPK, moved to BARUG in Jun. 2019)
- Donaldo "Dondon" C. Hontiveros (BARUG)
- Lea Ouano-Japson (BOPK)
- Prisca Niña O. Mabatid (BARUG)
- Renato Z. Osmeña Jr. (BARUG)
- Jocelyn G. Pesquera (BARUG)
- Eduardo R. Rama Jr. (BARUG)
- David F. Tumulak (ran under BOPK, moved to BARUG in Jun. 2019)
- Joy Augustus G. Young (BOPK)
- Phillip S. Zafra (BARUG)
- Franklyn O. Ong (LnB)
- Jessica P. Resch (SK)

=== 2016-2019, 14th SP ===
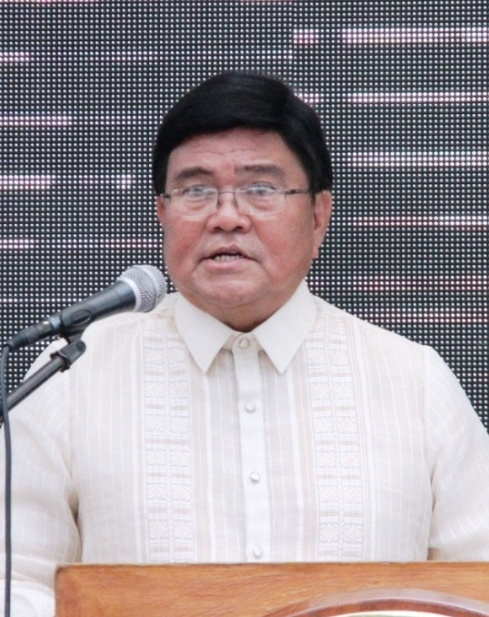
Edgardo Labella, presiding officer of 13th & 14th Sangguniang Panlungsod

Sixty-seven ordinances and over 4,600 resolutions were passed by the 14th council from 2016 to 2019. Eugenio Gabuya, Jr. had the largest number of approved ordinances of the 18 city legislators, and Margarita V. Osmeña had the largest number of approved resolutions. Sisinio Andales had perfect attendance during the council's 116 regular sessions.

- Edgardo C. Labella (presiding officer, BARUG)
- Alvin B. Arcilla (BOPK)
- Mary Ann C. De Los Santos (BOPK)
- Sisinio "Bebs" M. Andales (BOPK)
- Joy Augustus G. Young (BOPK)
- Jerry L. Guardo
- Raymond Alvin N. Garcia (BARUG)
- Pastor M. Alcover Jr. (BARUG)
- Joel C. Garganera (BARUG)
- David F. Tumulak (ran under BARUG, moved to BOPK in Aug. 2016)
- Margarita V. Osmeña (BOPK)
- Eduardo R. Rama Jr. (BARUG)
- Jose "Joey" C. Daluz III (BARUG)
- Nendell Hanz L. Abella (BARUG, replaced by Renato Osmeña, Jr. after his appointment to the NLRC)
- Eugenio "Jun" F. Gabuya Jr. (BOPK)
- James Anthony R. Cuenco (replaced by Erik Miguel Espina after his dismissal from service)
- Jocelyn G. Pesquera (BARUG)
- Phillip S. Zafra (LNB)

=== 2013-2016, 13th SP ===
On May 17, 2016, the Department of the Interior and Local Government (DILG) served a six-month preventive suspension order against Cebu City Mayor Michael Rama, Vice Mayor Edgardo Labella and 12 councilors for "grave abuse of authority." They allegedly received a ₱20,000 calamity fund, although they had not suffered in Super Typhoon Yolanda and the magnitude 7.2 earthquake which struck Cebu in 2013. Not included in the suspension order were Councilors Margarita Osmeña, Lea Ouano-Japson, Richard Osmeña, James Anthony Cuenco and Philip Zafra. Osmeña temporarily served as acting mayor and Japson as acting vice-mayor until June 30, 2016.

- Edgardo C. Labella (presiding officer, Team Rama; succeeded during suspension by Lea Ouano-Japson on May 17, 2016)
- Nestor D. Archival
- Mary Ann C. De Los Santos (Team Rama)
- Alvin B. Arcilla (BOPK)
- Sisinio "Bebs" M. Andales (BOPK)
- Lea Ouano-Japson (BOPK)
- Alvin M. Dizon (BOPK)
- Ma. Nida C. Cabrera (BOPK)
- Noel E. Wenceslao (Team Rama)
- Margarita V. Osmeña (BOPK)
- Gerardo A. Carillo (Team Rama)
- Eugenio "Jun" F. Gabuya Jr. (BOPK)
- David F. Tumulak
- Roberto "Bobcab" A. Cabarrubias (BOPK)
- James Anthony R. Cuenco
- Nendell Hanz L. Abella
- Richard Z. Osmeña
- Phillip S. Zafra (LNB)
- John Philip E. Po II (SK)

=== 2010-2013, 12th SP ===
The 12th council conducted its first regular offsite sessions in Barangays Bonbon, Guba and Luz on October 12 and 26, 2011 and August 15, 2012, respectively. The council went paperless on July 20, 2011, with councilors using their laptops (their own or issued by the city) for the regular session; this maintained the city's environmentally-friendly stance and saved money.

Notable ordinances passed by the council included City Ordinances No. 2339, which prohibited discrimination in the city on the basis of disability, age, health status, sexual orientation, gender identity, ethnicity or religion; No. 2343, which phased out single-use plastic products in the city and No. 2326, giving the elderly and people with disabilities free parking in malls, hospitals and other establishments.

All elected officials of the City Council for this term were elected members of BOPK, with several leaving for Team Rama (later BARUG) following Mayor Mike Rama's defection from BOPK.

- Joy Augustus G. Young (presiding officer)
- Edgardo C. Labella
- Augustus "Jun" G. Pe Jr.
- Alvin B. Arcilla
- Sisinio "Bebs" M. Andales
- Lea Ouano-Japson
- Alvin M. Dizon
- Noel E. Wenceslao
- Ma. Nida C. Cabrera
- Rodrigo "Bebot" A. Abellanosa
- Margarita V. Osmeña
- Eduardo R. Rama Jr.
- Jose "Joey" C. Daluz III
- Raul "Yayoy" D. Alcoseba
- Ronald R. Cuenco
- Richard Z. Osmeña
- Roberto "Bobcab" A. Cabarrubias
- Michael L. Ralota (LNB)
- John Philip E. Po II (SK)

=== 2007–2010, 11th SP ===
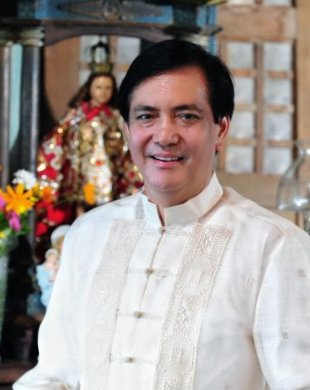
Michael Rama, presiding officer of 9th, 10th, 11th & 15th Sangguniang Panlungsod

The 11th council received two Local Legislative Awards in the Highly Urbanized or Independent Component Cities category for the substance of enacted legislation, efficiency of its records staff, completeness of the Agenda, Journals, and Minutes Division and the availability of facilities and amenities in the session hall.

All elected officials of the city council for this term were members of BOPK.

- Michael L. Rama (presiding officer)
- Hilario P. Davide III
- Nestor D. Archival
- Edgardo C. labella
- Sylvan "Jack" B. Jakosalem (1964-2021)
- Christopher I. Alix
- Edwin R. Jagmoc
- Lea Ouano-Japson
- Augustus "Jun" G. Pe Jr.
- Rodrigo "Bebot" A. Abellanosa
- Raul "Yayoy" D. Alcoseba
- Gerardo A. Carillo
- Jose "Joey" C. Daluz III
- Arsenio "Pax" C. Pacaña
- Eduardo R. Rama Jr.
- Richard Z. Osmeña
- Roberto "Bobcab" A. Cabarrubias
- Eugenio "Jing-Jing" F. Faelnar Jr. (LNB)
- Rengelle N. Pelayo (SK)

=== 2004-2007, 10th SP ===
All elected officials of the city council for this term were members of BOPK.

- Michael L. Rama (presiding officer)
- Hilario P. Davide III
- Nestor D. Archival
- Sylvan "Jack" B. Jakosalem (1964-2021)
- Edgardo C. Labella
- Christopher I. Alix
- Gabriel V. Leyson
- Edwin R. Jagmoc
- Augustus "Jun" G. Pe Jr.
- Rodrigo "Bebot" A. Abellanosa
- Eduardo R. Rama Jr.
- Gerardo A. Carillo
- Arsenio "Pax" C. Pacaña
- Jocelyn G. Pesquera
- Procopio E. Fernandez
- Raul "Yayoy" D. Alcoseba
- Jose "Joey" C. Daluz III
- Eugenio "Jing-Jing" F. Faelnar Jr. (LNB)
- Glena C. Bontuyan (SK)

=== 2001-2004, 9th SP ===
Following Mayor Alvin Garcia's defection from BOPK to form Kugi Uswag Sugbo (KUSUG), BOPK retained a council majority in the 2001 Cebu City local elections of 11 seats, with the other 5 seats going to KUSUG. This council passed City Ordinance No. 1969, defining the guidelines for the selection of beneficiaries of socialized housing, on August 27, 2003.

- Michael L. Rama (presiding officer, BOPK)
- Nestor D. Archival (BOPK)
- Christopher I. Alix (BOPK)
- Carmelita L. Piramide (KUSUG)
- Danilo M. Fernan (KUSUG)
- Sylvan "Jack" B. Jakosalem (BOPK) (1964-2021)
- Dana R. Sesante (KUSUG)
- Vicente Kintanar Jr. (BOPK)
- Manuel "Maning" P. Legaspi (BOPK) (1949-2026)
- Jocelyn G. Pesquera (BOPK)
- Procopio E. Fernandez (BOPK)
- Eugenio "Jun" F. Gabuya Jr. (KUSUG)
- Gerardo A. Carillo (BOPK)
- Arsenio "Pax" C. Pacaña (BOPK)
- George R. Rama (BOPK)
- Gabriel V. Leyson (BOPK)
- Firmo S. Dayao (KUSUG, resigned Sep. 26, 2001)
- Jose Navarro (LNB until 2002)
- Eugenio Faelnar Jr. (LNB 2002–2004)
- Glena Bontuyan (SK)

=== 1998-2001, 8th SP ===
City Ordinance No. 1726, establishing the Cebu City Commission for the Welfare and Protection of Children, was passed by this council. All elected officials of the city council for this term were members of BOPK.

- Renato V. Osmeña (presiding officer)
- Franklin N. Seno (president pro tempore)
- Michael L. Rama (majority floor leader)
- Rogelio V. Osmeña (assistant majority floor leader)
- Ronald R. Cuenco
- Firmo S. Dayao (KUSUG)
- Ernesto A. Elizondo
- Rodolfo Y. Estella
- Procopio E. Fernandez
- Eugenio "Jun" F. Gabuya Jr.
- Edgardo C. Labella
- Manuel P. "Maning" Legaspi (1949-2026)
- Laurito M. Malinao
- Ananias G. Ouano
- Jocelyn G. Pesquera
- Felixberto A. Rosito
- Fe Mantua-Ruiz
- Jose F. Navarro (LNB)
- Anthony Jones Luy (SK)

=== 1995-1998, 7th SP ===
City Ordinance No. 1656, revising the city's comprehensive zoning regulations, was passed by this council. All elected officials of the city council for this term were members of BOPK.

- Renato V. Osmeña (presiding officer)
- Rodolfo Y. Cabrera (president pro tempore)
- Jessie M. Aznar (floor leader)
- Ruben C. de la Cerna (assistant floor leader)
- Eleno V. Abellana
- Christopher I. Alix
- Manuel L. Concepcion
- Ronald R. Cuenco
- Rico Rey Francis S. Holganza
- Gabriel V. Leyson
- Laurito M. Malinao
- Rogelio V. Osmeña
- Arnulfo R. Ravina
- Felixberto A. Rosito
- Fe Mantua-Ruiz
- Joy Augustus G. Young
- Michael L. Rama
- Ananias G. Ouano (LNB)
- Anthony Jones Luy (SK)

=== 1992–1995, 6th SP ===
City Ordinance No. 1524, which created the Cebu City Division for the Welfare of the Urban Poor (DWUP), was passed by this council.

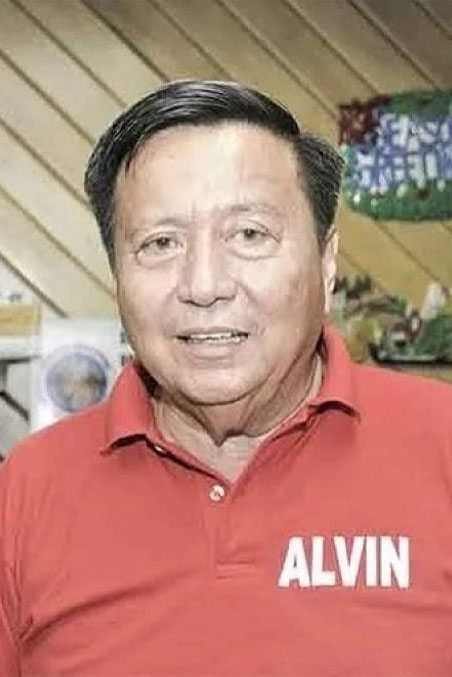
Alvin Garcia, presiding officer of 5th and 6th Sangguniang Panlungsod

- Alvin B. Garcia (presiding officer)
- Rodolfo Y. Cabrera (president pro tempore)
- Eleno V. Abellana (majority floor leader)
- Joy Augustus G. Young (assistant majority floor leader)
- Ronald R. Cuenco (minority floor leader)
- Christopher I. Alix
- Jessie M. Aznar
- Ruben C. dela Cerna
- Manuel L. Concepcion
- Rico Rey Francis S. Holganza
- Laurito M. Malinao
- Renato V. Osmeña
- Ramon B. Quisumbing
- Michael L. Rama
- Arnulfo R. Ravina
- Felixberto A. Rosito
- Fe Mantua Ruiz
- Ananias G. Ouano (LNB)
- Charles T. Vailoces (SK, first Cebu City SK Federation president)

=== 1988–1992, 5th SP ===
City Ordinance No. 1361, establishing the garbage collection system of Cebu City, was passed on February 5, 1990 by this council. This council was also the first to feature members of BOPK, alongside members of Partido Panaghiusa.

- Alvin B. Garcia (presiding officer, BOPK)
- Rodolfo Y. Cabrera (president pro tempore)
- Franklyn N. Seno (majority floor leader, BOPK)
- Vicente A. Kintanar Jr. (minority floor leader, Panaghiusa)
- Joy Augustus G. Young (assistant majority floor leader, BOPK)
- Eulogio B. Borres Jr. (assistant minority floor leader, Panaghiusa)
- Eleno V. Abellana
- Jessie M. Aznar
- Ruben C. dela Cerna
- Manuel L. Concepcion
- Procopio E. Fernandez
- Ruendo G. Martinez
- Pureza G. Oñate
- Renato V. Osmeña (BOPK)
- Ananias G. Ouano
- Avenescio A. Piramide
- Clemente G. Rama (BOPK)
- Arnulfo R. Ravina

=== 1987–1988 ===
City Ordinance No. 1254, enacted upon the request of the Guadalupe Village Homeowners Association of Punta Princesa, Cebu City to rename their subdivision from "Guadalupe Village" to "Guadalupe V. Osmeña Village" after the daughter of former President Sergio Osmeña, was passed by this council on July 6, 1987. The members were appointed as Officers in Charge (OICs) by then-President Corazon Aquino in the aftermath of the 1986 People Power Revolution, serving until February 2, 1988.

- Augusto W. Go (presiding officer, Mar. 19, 1987–Nov. 27, 1987)
- Joseph S. Gaisano (presiding officer, Nov. 27, 1987–Feb. 2, 1988)
- Clemente G. Rama
- Emmanuel R. Pacquiao
- Alfonso U. Alerre
- Nicolen R. Aricayos
- Antonio A. Avila Jr
- Jessie M. Aznar
- Eulogio B. Borres Jr.
- Julio L. Climaco
- Elpidio B. Go
- Panfilo B. Malazarte
- Pureza T. Onate
- Ramsey M. Quijano
- Mario R. Veloso
- Arnulfo R. Ravina

=== 1980–1987 ===
The following vice mayors and members served during the period of the Marcos dictatorship, the subsequent 1986 People Power Revolution, and the subsequent appointment of OIC city officials in 1987.

1986–1987

- John Henry "Sonny" R. Osmeña (presiding officer, Mar. 25, 1986–Mar. 19, 1987)
- Jose "Boy" V. Cuenco (presiding officer, Mar. 25, 1986–Mar. 19, 1987)

1983

The following members served on the Cebu City Council in 1983, during which City Ordinance No. 1139 renaming a formerly unnamed street after engineer and former City Councilor Joaquin L. Panis was enacted on January 24:

- Ronald R. Duterte (KBL, presiding officer, 1980–1983)
- Vicente A. Kintanar Jr. (presiding officer, 1983–Mar. 25, 1986)
- Jesus B. Garcia, Jr.
- Leonardo S. Manlosa
- Suga Sotto-Yuvienco
- Franklin N. Seno
- Clinton P. Gumalo
- Pablo U. Abella
- Emmanuel B. Aznar
- Rodolfo Y. Cabrera
- Jose "Boy" V. Cuenco
- Bienvenido B. Tudtud
- Renato V. Osmeña (appointed 1982–1985)
- Pompio A. Paradiang, secretary to the Council

=== 1971–1980 ===
City Ordinance No. 971, which renamed Sampaguita Street in Barangay Lahug as Clotildo S. Rosal Street, was passed by this Council.

- Eulogio "Yoyong" E. Borres (Panaghiusa, mayor and presiding officer)
- Ronald R. Duterte (KBL, presiding officer pro tempore)
- Bienvenido B. Tudtud (floor leader)
- Emilio Rm. Jaca (assistant floor leader)
- Edgar C. Abelgas
- Pablo U. Abella
- Arturo L. Abellana
- Emilio E. Alcoseba
- Raymundo A. Crsytal
- Jose "Boy" V. Cuenco
- Jesus S. Gabuya
- Maximino R. Lazarte
- Guadalupe O. Mansueto
- Telesforo B. Rabaya
- Fernando G. Rama
- Franklin N. Seno
- Emeterio L. Sapapo
- Mario R. Veloso
- Bernardo S. Zamora
- Pompio A. Paradiang, secretary to the Council

=== 1967–1971 ===
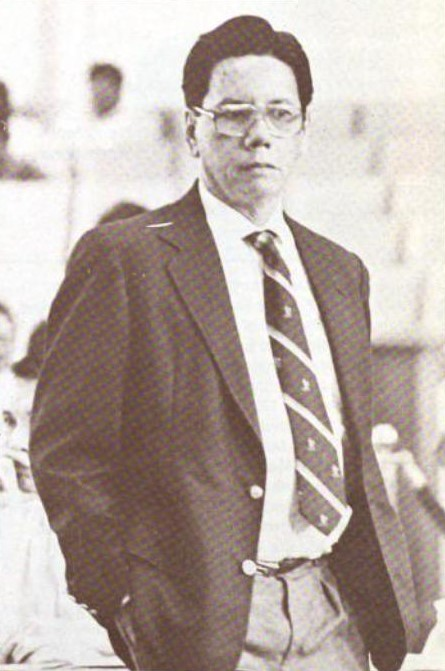
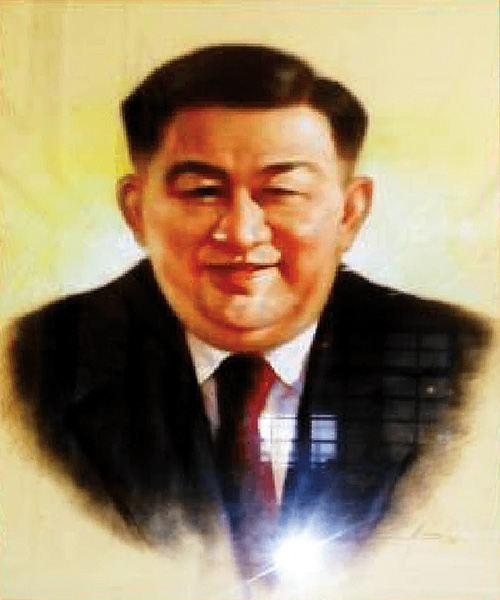
John Henry Osmeña and Jose V. Rodriguez, presiding officers of the 1967–1971 city council.

The following members of this council all ran and won under the Liberal lineup of then-Senator Sergio "Serging" V. Osmeña, sweeping all council positions in the November 14, 1967 elections and assuming office on December 30. Osmeña did not assume office as mayor in order to finish his Senate term, resulting in Vice Mayor Eulogio Borres succeeding as mayor on January 13, 1968.

- Eulogio "Yoyong" E. Borres (presiding officer until Jan. 3, 1968, succeeded as mayor)
- John Henry "Sonny" R. Osmeña (presiding officer Jan. 3, 1968 – Dec. 30, 1969, resigned to run for the Senate)
- Florencio S. Urot (succeeded as acting mayor on Sep. 13, 1971)
- Jose V. Rodriguez (presiding officer Sep. 13, 1971 – Dec. 31, 1971)
- Raymundo A. Crystal
- Ronald R. Duterte
- Bienvenido B. Tudtud
- Arturo L. Abellana
- Jesus S. Gabuya
- Jose V. Arias
- Caridad A. Trocino
- Leodegario C. Salazar, secretary to the City Council

=== 1963–1967 ===
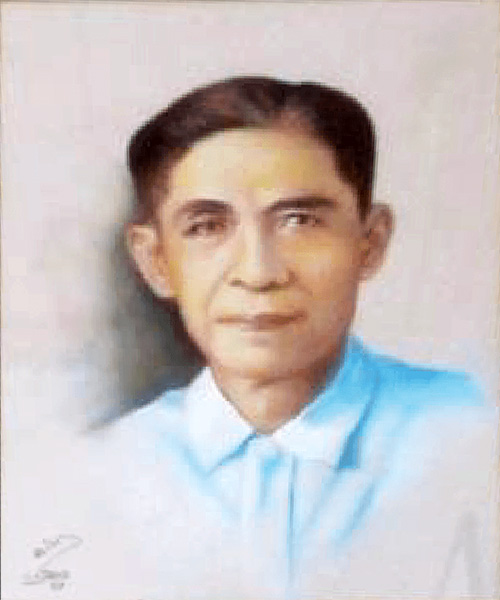
Florencio S. Urot, presiding officer of the 1963–1967 city council

The following members were elected on November 12, 1963. This council commemorated the 400th anniversary of the Christianization of Cebu.

- Florencio S. Urot (presiding officer)
- Luis V. Diores (LP)
- Ronald R. Duterte
- John Henry R. Osmeña (LP)
- Raymundo A. Crystal
- Eulogio "Yoyong" E. Borres
- Mario R. Veloso
- Ronald R. Duterte
- Bienvenido B. Tudtud
- Benjamin C. Llanos
- Leodogario C. Salazar, secretary to the Council

=== 1959–1963 ===
The following were elected to the Cebu City Council on November 10, 1959:

- Carlos J. Cuizon (presiding officer, Dec. 30, 1959–Jan. 1, 1960)
- Mario D. Ortiz (presiding officer, Jan. 1, 1960 onwards)
- Florencio S. Urot
- Osmundo G. Rama
- Nazario R. Pacquiao
- Raymundo A. Crystal
- Eulogio "Yoyong" E. Borres
- Juan C. Zamora
- Luis V. Diores
- Jesus S. Gabuya

=== 1955–1959 ===
The following members were elected along with the first-ever elected mayor and vice mayor in 1955:

- Ramon G. Duterte (presiding officer)
- Casimiro V. Madarang
- Joaquin L. Panis
- Carlos J. Cuizon
- Osmundo G. Rama
- Florencio S. Urot
- Ceferina U. del Rosario, first female councilor of Cebu City
- Pedro B. Clavano
- Generoso Jaca
- Cecilio de la Victoria

=== 1951–1954 ===
- Carlos J. Cuizon (presiding officer, appointed Apr. 9, 1953)
- Florentino D. Tecson (presiding officer, appointed Jan. 28, 1954)
- Eulogio "Yoyong" E. Borres

=== 1947–1951 ===
The following members were elected to the Cebu City Council on November 11, 1947, assuming office on December 30:

- Arsenio R. Villanueva (presiding officer, appointed July 16, 1948)
- Florencio S. Urot
- Florentino D. Tecson
- Jose L. Briones
- Eulogio "Yoyong" E. Borres
- Jose Caban
- Carlos J. Cuizon
- Eugenio G. Corro
- Casimiro V. Madarang

=== 1946–1947 ===
The following members were appointed by President Manuel Roxas on June 8, 1946: City Ordinance No. 51, which banned the sale and consumption of carabao and horse meat, was passed on June 20, 1947 by this council.

- Marcos M. Morelos (presiding officer)
- Catalina S. Ybañez
- Filemon R. Zapanta (floor leader)
- Cresencio Tomakin
- Paciente S. Villa (1889–1974)
- Magno Paez
- Juan C. Seno
- Jovito S. Abellana
- Jose Fortich, secretary to the Council

=== 1946 ===
The following members assumed office on January 17, 1946.

- Honorato S. Hermosisima Sr.
- Cecilio de la Victoria
- Florencio S. Urot
- Juan C. Zamora
- Florentino D. Tecson
- Ramón D. Abellanosa
- Numeriano G. Estanzo Sr. (1909–1997)
- Alfonso S. Frias

=== 1945–1946 ===
The following members assumed office on May 8, 1945, the first after the liberation of Cebu City on April 8, and convened on July 1. City Ordinance No. 2, which regulated tartanilla fares, was enacted on July 12, 1945 by this council.

- Honorato S. Hermosisima Sr. (presiding officer)
- Cecilio dela Victoria
- Florencio S. Urot
- Numeriano G. Estanzo Sr. (1909–1997)
- Eugenio G. Corro
- Canuto Octavio R. Borromeo (1891–1959)
- Alfonso S. Frias
- Miguel Sanson
- Pio Kabahar, secretary to the City Council

=== 1940 ===
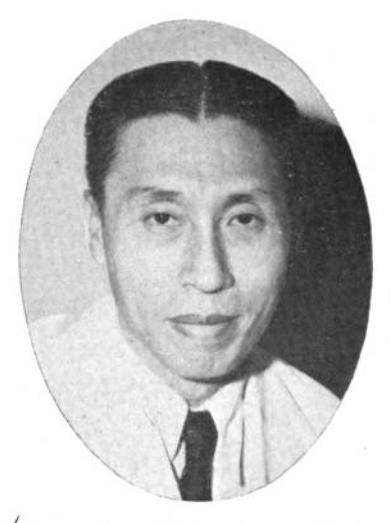
Leandro A. Tojong, presiding officer of the Cebu City Council, elected in 1940

The following members were elected to the Cebu City Council on December 10, 1940:

- Leandro A. Tojong (presiding officer)
- Juan C. Zamora
- Honorato S. Hermosisima Sr.
- Florentino D. Tecson
- Cecilio de la Victoria
- Ramón D. Abellanosa
- Florencio S. Urot
- Numeriano G. Estanzo Sr. (1909–1997)

=== 1937–1940, first city council ===
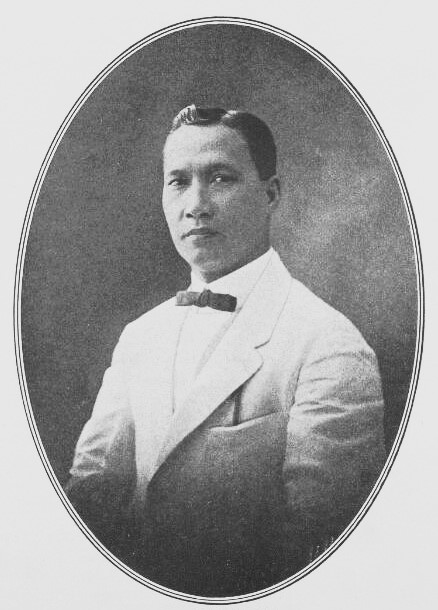
Manuel A. Roa, presiding officer of the first Cebu City Council

The following members were elected to the Cebu City Council on December 14, 1937, the first following the enactment of the Cebu City Charter:

- Manuel A. Roa (presiding officer)
- Regino Mercado
- Felipe L. Pacaña
- Leandro A. Tojong
- Jose N. Solon
- Diego Cañizares
- Jose P. Nolasco
- Jose Fortich
- Dominador Abella
- Juan C. Zamora

=== 1917 ===
The following were the members of the Junta Municipal de Cebu (Municipal Government of Cebu) in 1917:

- Fructuoso R. Ramos (municipal president)
- Damaso Leyson (municipal vice president)
- Rufino Lauron (municipal vice president, 1916–1920)
- Andres E. Jayme, lawyer, journalist, and aide to Gen. Arcadio Maxilom during the Philippine–American War
- Jose Ma. V. Borromeo, doctor
- Quirino Rodriguez
- Vicente Rama (served 1916–1922)
- Julio Diaz
- Ma. Francisco Labrador (served 1912–1924; d. Jan. 3, 1958)
- Jose N. Solon
- Andres R. Borres, father of future Mayor Eulogio Borres
- Pedro Casquejo
- Jose Ma. Roa
- Filemon del Mar
- Isidro Enriquez
- Jose P. Nolasco
- Eutiquio Sabellano
- Uldarico Alviola, secretary to the Municipal Board

=== 1901–1916 ===
The following presidents, vice presidents, and members of the Junta Municipal de Cebu (Municipal Government of Cebu) served from 1901 to 1916:

- Florentino C. Rallos (1860–1912) — president, 1901–1905
- Celestino L. Rodriguez (1872–1955) — president, 1905–1907
- Luciano Abellana Bacayo (1873–?) — president, 1907–1908; vice president, 1905–1907
- Martin P. Llorente (1868–1916) — president, 1908–1909
- Melchor Gonzalez (1873–1950?) — president, 1909–1910
- Vicente L. Teves — president, 1910–1913
- Arsenio V. Climaco (1870–1952) — president, 1913–1916
- Agapito Hilario — vice president, 1901–1903
- Filemon Y. Sotto (1872–1966) — vice president, 1903–1905
- Raimundo Bracamonte Enriquez — vice president, 1907–1908
- Francisco V. Arias — vice president, 1908–1909
- Pedro Abarca — vice president, 1909–1910
- Gregorio Abendan — vice president, 1910–1913
- Fructuoso R. Ramos (1869–1949) — vice president, 1913–1916
- Lucas O. Gabuya (served c. 1900)

=== Other council members ===
- Clotildo S. Rosal (served 1919–1925)
- Gervasio L. Lavilles (served c. 1930s), described as the "brains of the Cebu City Charter
- Conrado C. Tudtud (Partido Democrata, early 20th century), policeman, businessman

== Timeline ==
=== Majority Control ===
Cebu City Council Majority Control (1988–present)
| Election | Vice Mayor (Note: As the presiding officer of the City Council, the vice mayor can only vote to break a tie.) | Council Members | Majority (Note: A two-thirds council majority, which can override mayoral vetos, constitutes a supermajority.) | Ref |
|---|---|---|---|---|
| 1988 | Alvin Garcia | | Panaghiusa | |
| 1992 | Alvin Garcia | Data unavailable | | |
| 1995 | Renato Osmeña | | BOPK supermajority | |
| 1998 | Renato Osmeña | | BOPK supermajority | |
| 2001 | Mike Rama | | BOPK | |
| 2004 | Mike Rama | | BOPK supermajority | |
| 2007 | Mike Rama | | BOPK supermajority | |
| 2010 | Joy Young | | BOPK supermajority | |
| 2013 | Edgardo Labella | | BOPK supermajority (Note: With the abolition of the Sangguniang Kabataan (SK) from 2013 to 2018, the number of ex officio council members was reduced from 2 to 1, as there were no SK councils to elect an SK Federation president.) | |
| 2016 | Edgardo Labella | | BARUG | |
| 2019 | Mike Rama | | BOPK (Note: Although BOPK in 2019 won only half of the council's seats while losing the vice mayor position, Vice Mayor Mike Rama's (BARUG) tie-breaking vote as presiding officer did not give BARUG an effective majority, due to ex officio members Franklyn Ong (LnB) and Jessica Resch (SK) allying with BOPK despite their offices being nominally nonpartisan. Both ex officio members were elected in the 2018 Barangay and Sangguniang Kabataan elections. As a result, BOPK emerged from the 2019 elections with 10 out of 18 council votes.) | |
| 2022 | Raymond Garcia | | BARUG supermajority | |
| 2025 | Tomas Osmeña | | KUSUG-BARUG supermajority (Note: BOPK, BARUG, and KUSUG each have 6 votes, as ex officio members Franklyn Ong (LnB) and Rhea Jakosalem (SK) have both allied with BARUG. After BARUG and KUSUG entered into a majority coalition, they now possess a combined total of 12 votes, giving them a two-thirds supermajority.) | |

=== Members from 2004–2025 (national parties) ===
The name of the president of the Philippines is displayed at the top, followed by the council members. (Note: Due to the unavailability of specific vote and ranking data for council races prior to the 2010 elections, new councilors prior to 2010 are sorted in alphabetical order of their last names, while new councilors from 2010 onwards are sorted by their rankings. Individuals who first join the council by being elected vice mayor (presiding officer), rather than councilor, are always listed first in their election year.) (Note: Presidential administrations are displayed to better contextualize national affiliations; local politicians in the Philippines tend to change parties by joining either the party led by the sitting president of the Philippines, an allied national party, or a prominent national opposition party if the president is already backing a local rival.)

=== Members from 2004–2025 (local blocs) ===
The name of the Mayor of Cebu City is displayed at the top, followed by the council members. (Note: Mayors' names are displayed to show whether or not the sitting administration has a council majority.) (Note: Councilor James Anthony Cuenco was dismissed from office by the Ombudsman on October 4, 2017, after which UNA nominated Eric Espina as his replacement. Espina served until Cuenco was ordered reinstated by the DILG on January 3, 2019, after the Court of Appeals overturned the Ombudsman's decision on October 19, 2018.) (Note: Councilor Antonio Cuenco died in office on June 27, 2020, after which he was replaced by his son, former Councilor James Anthony Cuenco.) (Note: On February 10, 2022, President Rodrigo Duterte appointed former Councilor Jocelyn "Joy" Pesquera to fill the vacancy created by first-ranked Councilor Dondon Hontiveros's ascension to vice mayor, following the death of Mayor Edgar Labella on November 19, 2021.) (Note: Councilor Ramon "Yayoy" Alcoseba died in office on April 25, 2022.) (Note: Vice Mayor Raymond Alvin Garcia assumed the office of mayor on October 9, 2024 after then-Mayor Rama was dismissed from office by the Ombudsman due to nepotism charges.)

== See also ==
- Sangguniang Panlungsod
- Manila City Council
- Zamboanga City Council
