= Jose V. Rodriguez =

Filipino medical doctor, politician

José V. Rodríguez
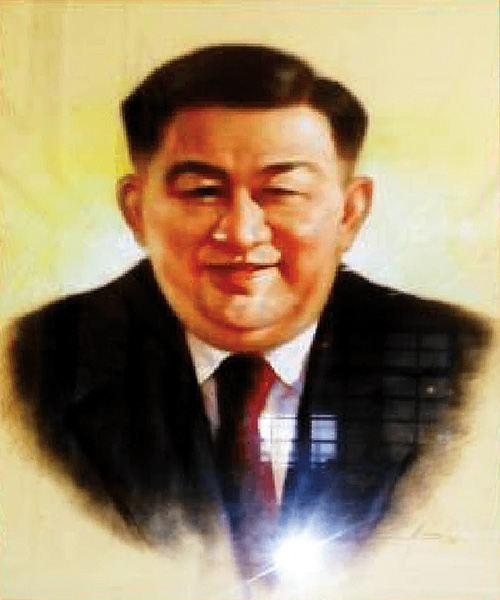

11th Mayor of Cebu City
- In office December 7, 1953 – November 16, 1955
- Vice Mayor: Carlos Cuizon (1953–1954); Florentino Tecson (1954–1955)
- Preceded by: Vicente Del Rosario
- Succeeded by: Pedro Clavano
- In office August 18, 1951 – July 23, 1952
- Vice Mayor: Carlos Cuizon
- Preceded by: Pedro Elizalde
- Succeeded by: Vicente Del Rosario

Vice Mayor of Cebu City
- In office September 13, 1971 – December 31, 1971
- Mayor: Florencio Urot
- Preceded by: John Henry Osmeña
- Succeeded by: Eulogio Borres

Member of the Philippine House of Representatives from Cebu's 7th district
- In office June 9, 1945 – December 30, 1949
- Preceded by: Roque V. Desquitado
- Succeeded by: Nicolas Escario

Member of the Cebu City Council
- In office December 30, 1967 – September 13, 1971

Personal details
- Born: José Rodríguez y Chiong Veloso; 9 July 1906 Cebu City, Philippine Islands
- Party: Nacionalista
- Relatives: Celestino Rodriguez; Buenaventura Rodriguez; Pedro Rodriguez (politician)
- Occupation: Politician
- Profession: Physician; Educator

José Chiong Veloso Rodríguez (July 9, 1906, date of death unknown) was a Filipino Visayan medical doctor, politician, and legislator from Cebu, Philippines. He was elected Congressman for Cebu's 7th district in the 1st Congress of the Commonwealth, 2nd Congress of the Commonwealth, and the 1st Congress of the Republic (1945-1949). On November 9, 1952, he was appointed mayor of Cebu City until November 16, 1955.

== Early life and career ==
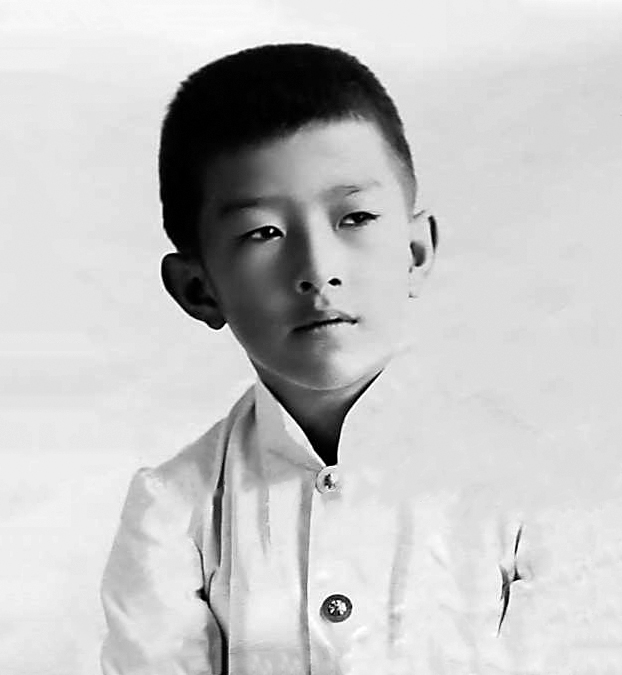
Rodríguez on his U.S. passport application in 1916

Jose Rodriguez was born in Cebu City on July 9, 1906 to Pedro Rodríguez y Lasala and Tomasa Chiong-Veloso y Rosales, descended from wealthy Bogo family with extensive landholdings in the northern sugar-belt towns of the province. A medical practitioner, he taught at Instituto Rubio in Madrid, Spain and was a professor of medicine at the University of Santo Tomas.

== House of Representatives ==
He was elected to the Congress' lower house representing Cebu's 7th District in 1941, but his term was cut short due to the outbreak of World War II. In 1945, he would be reelected to the same post in the 1st Congress of the Commonwealth and served another term in 1946 in the 2nd Congress of the Commonwealth. He would be elected again as Member of the 1st Congress of the Republic and represented the 7th District of Cebu from 1946 until 1949.

== Mayor of Cebu City (1952–1953; 1953–1955) ==
On November 9, 1952, Rodriguez was appointed Cebu City mayor and Appointments Committee confirmed his position on March 26, 1953. On April 6 of the same year, he was asked to vacate the post by the interim secretary and directed to act as technical assistant to the then President Elpidio Quirino. Three days later, Vicente del Rosario was appointed acting mayor. Rodriguez contested his removal from the office in court and the Supreme Court decided in his favor.

In his time, the local government units employed independent contractors to act as law enforcers and detectives for the city's chief executive. The group in Cebu City was known as SECRETA. On October 28,1952, Rodriguez dismissed Ahmed Alcamel Abella, a police detective who was appointed since October 1, 1947. Abella sued. While the Court of First Instance ruled in favor of Rodriguez, the Supreme Court overturned the decision and ordered Abella to be reinstated back to service on June 29, 1954.

During his term, the Boy's Town in Punta Princesa, Labangon was established. Rodriguez remained mayor until November 16, 1955 and was succeeded by Pedro Clavano.

== Cebu City Council (1967–1971) ==
Rodriguez ran for the Cebu City Council in the November 14, 1967 Cebu City elections under the Liberal lineup of Senator Sergio Osmeña Jr. and won, placing second among nine councilors.

== Vice Mayor of Cebu City (1971) ==
On September 13, 1971, then-second ranked Councilor Rodriguez succeeded as acting vice mayor of Cebu City, with first-ranked Councilor Florencio Urot succeeding as acting mayor, after Mayor Eulogio Borres and Vice Mayor John Henry Osmeña resigned in order to seek other elective positions. He served as vice mayor for a period of 108 days until December 31 of the same year.
