= Mayor of Cebu City =

Local chief executive of Cebu City, Philippines

- Tagalog: Punong Lungsod ng Cebu; Cebuano: Punong Dakbayan sa Sugbo
- Seal of the Mayor of Cebu City

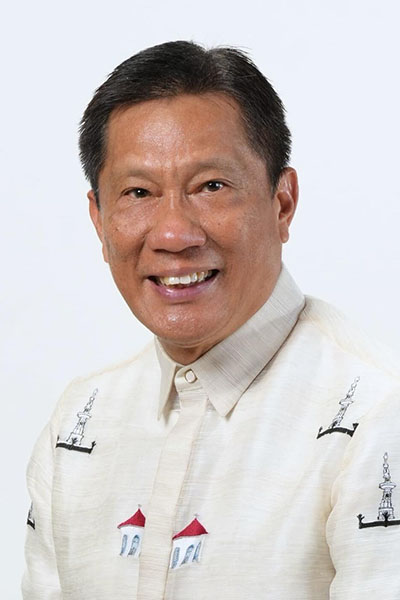
- Incumbent; Nestor Archival since June 30, 2025
- Style: The Honorable
- Seat: Cebu City Hall
- Appointer: Elected via popular vote
- Term length: Three years, renewable twice consecutively
- Formation: 1936
- First holder: Alfredo V. Jacinto
- Succession: Vice Mayor then highest-ranking Sangguniang Panlungsod member
- Deputy: Vice Mayor
- Salary: ₱204,054 per month (2021)
- Website: cebucity.gov.ph

The Mayor of Cebu City (Cebuano: Punong Dakbayan sa Sugbo) is the chief executive of the government of Cebu City in the Philippines. The mayor leads the city's departments in executing ordinances and delivering public services. The mayorship is a three-year term and each mayor is restricted to three consecutive terms, totaling nine years, although a mayor can be elected again after an interruption of one term.

The current mayor is Nestor D. Archival Sr. of Bando Osmeña – Pundok Kauswagan (BOPK), who was elected in 2025 with an upset victory over incumbent mayor Raymond Alvin Garcia (KUSUG) and their predecessor former mayor Michael Rama (BARUG). Archival took his ceremonial oath of office on June 26, 2025 and officially began his term on June 30.

== History ==
=== Appointive position ===
Commonwealth Act No. 38 or the Charter of the City of Cebu, signed on October 20, 1936 and officially inaugurated on February 24, 1937, created the post of City Mayor which shall be appointed by the President of the Philippines with the approval of the Commission on Appointments. President Manuel Quezon appointed Alfredo V. Jacinto of Gapan, Nueva Ecija.

Born on March 23, 1891, Jacinto was not a Cebuano. His first assignment outside of Nueva Ecija was in Manila to become Chief Clerk of the Treasurer's Office of Malolos, Bulacan. Jacinto was transferred to Leyte and then to Pangasinan. In March 1930, he was sent to Cebu after his last assignment in Luzon in La Union. Before he was appointed as City Mayor, he was Provincial Treasurer of Cebu. He resigned from the position on December 31, 1936.

Jacinto took his oath of office at Malacañang Palace before Elpidio Quirino, the Secretary of the Interior on January 7, 1937. Along with him, the following city councilors were sworn into office by Secretary Quirino namely, Manuel Roa (the first President of the Municipal Board), Regino Mercado, Felipe Pacaña, Jose Fortich, Diego Canizares, Jose P. Nolasco, Leandro A. Tojong and Dominador J. Abella.

The next to be appointed was Vicente Rama who served as city mayor from 1938 to 1940. When World War II erupted, Rama sought refuge in Carcar where he was appointed as wartime mayor by the Imperial Japanese Army.

A year before the war, Jose Delgado was appointed as city mayor from 1940 to 1942. Delgado also became governor of Cebu from 1943 to 1944. Next in line was Juan Cerilles Zamora.

Then there was Dr. Leandro Tojong of Ginatilan, Cebu, followed by another doctor, Nicolas Escario of Bantayan, Cebu, followed by lawyer Vicente S. del Rosario, then Dr. Luis Espina, Miguel Raffiñan, Pedro Elizalde, Dr. Jose V. Rodriguez, and Pedro Clavano, all of which were appointed by the president.

=== Elective position ===
On June 7, 1955, the Cebu City Charter was amended by Republic Act No. 1233. The first election for City mayor was held on November 8, 1955 together with the 1955 senatorial elections. The first to be elected as city mayor was Sergio Osmeña Jr. together with his vice mayor Ramon Duterte.

Osmeña Jr. was elected mayor five times in 1955, 1959, 1963, 1967, and 1971, a feat that would only be surpassed by his son Tomas Osmeña in the late 1980s to 2010s. Osmeña Jr. was severely injured in the Plaza Miranda Bombing on August 21, 1971, heading into exile in the United States and remaining there after the declaration of Martial Law and imposition of dictatorship by his political rival, President Ferdinand Marcos.

From 1978 to 1988, the office was occupied by several appointed mayors. Marcos appointed Florentino Solon in 1978, who then won a full term in the 1980 elections. Solon resigned in 1983 after Marcos appointed him Deputy Minister of Health, succeeded by Vice Mayor Ronald Duterte who served until President Corazon Aquino forced the removal of all local chief executives and their replacement with officers-in-charge (OICs).

John Henry Osmeña was appointed OIC Mayor on March 25, 1986, before resigning to run for senator in 1987. He was succeeded by appointed OIC Jose V. Cuenco on March 19, 1987 until his resignation to run for a full term as mayor on November 27. Cuenco was followed by Antonio R. Veloso who served until the resumption of elective terms on February 2, 1988, upon the election of Tomas Osmeña as mayor.

=== 1988 to present ===
From the late 1990s onwards, the city was beset by a pattern of conflicts between mayors and their political heirs, with the former criticizing the latter's policies as mayor:

- Then-Mayor Alvin Garcia, successor and former vice mayor to Tomas Osmeña, bolted the latter's party to found Kugi Uswag Sugbo (KUSUG) following a rift that first emerged in 1997.
- After Tomas Osmeña reached the 3-term limit, he ran for Congress in 2010 and was succeeded by allied Vice Mayor Mike Rama. Conflict eventually emerged between the two over Rama's handling of the city, culminating in Rama leaving BOPK to found his own party, Team Rama in 2013.
- In 2021, Mike Rama, once again vice mayor, criticized ally Mayor Edgardo Labella for the latter's handling of the COVID-19 pandemic, to which Labella responded by accusing Rama of playing politics. Rama once again assumed the office of mayor following Labella's death from sepsis on November 19, 2021.
- In 2024, following Rama's suspension from office, he became increasingly critical of the leadership of his ally and vice mayor, Acting Mayor Raymond Garcia. Rama eventually ended the alliance between him and Garcia on September 25.

In 2024, Rama became the first mayor of Cebu City to be removed by the Ombudsman of the Philippines, being dismissed from office and permanently disqualified from public service on October 3, after being found guilty of nepotism and grave misconduct.

== Salary ==
As of 2021, the mayor is paid a monthly salary of ₱204,054 based on the second tranche of the Salary Standardization Law of 2019 with the position being classified under salary grade 30.

== List ==
=== Municipality of Cebu ===
The following served as municipal presidents of Cebu:

No.	Image	President (birth–death)	Party (Note: From 1900 to 1907, Philippine politics was dominated by the Federalistas. It was supplanted by the two-party system that emerged in 1907 between the dominant Nacionalista Party and its opposition, the Progresistas and later the Democratas.)	Term	Vice President
1		Florentino Cuico Rallos; 1860–1912 (aged 51-52)	Independent; Nacionalista after 1907	1901 – 1903	Agapito Hilario
1		Florentino Cuico Rallos; 1860–1912 (aged 51-52)	Independent; Nacionalista after 1907	1903 – 1905	Filemon Yap Sotto; Nacionalista
2		Celestino Lasala Rodriguez; 1872–1955 (aged 82-83)	Independent Nacionalista (from 1907)	1905 – 1907	Luciano Abellana Bacayo
3		Luciano Abellana Bacayo c. 1873–?		1907 – 1908	Raimundo Bracamonte Enriquez
4		Martin Pantaleon Llorente c.1868–1916 (aged ~49)	Federalista	1908 – 1909	Francisco Arias; Nacionalista
5		Melchor Gonzalez c. 1873–1950?		1909 – 1910	Pedro Abarca
6		Vicente L. Teves		1910 – 1913	Gregorio Abendan
7		Arsenio Veloso Climaco; 1870–1952 (aged 82)		1913 – 1916	Fructuoso Rodis Ramos; Nacionalista
8		Fructuoso Rodis Ramos; 1869–1949 (aged 80)	Nacionalista	1916 – 1920	Rufino Lauron
8		Fructuoso Rodis Ramos; 1869–1949 (aged 80)	Nacionalista	1920 – 1922	Pedro Abella
9		Hilario Hermosa Abellana; 1896–1945 (aged 48)	Democrata	1922 – 1925	Julian Lochallan Alcantara
9		Hilario Hermosa Abellana; 1896–1945 (aged 48)	Democrata	1925 – 1928	Alberto Mansueto
9		Hilario Hermosa Abellana; 1896–1945 (aged 48)	Democrata	1928 – 1931	Regino Mercado
(8)		Fructuoso Rodis Ramos; 1869–1949 (aged 80)	Nacionalista	1931 – 1934	Jose Fortich; Democrata
(8)		Fructuoso Rodis Ramos; 1869–1949 (aged 80)	Nacionalista	1934 – 1937	Julian Lochallan Alcantara
(8)		Fructuoso Rodis Ramos; 1869–1949 (aged 80)	Nacionalista	1934 – 1937	Marcos Miranda Morelos
10		Mariano Jesus Diosomito Cuenco^{1} 1888–1964 (aged 76)	Nacionalista	November 28, 1936 – December 1, 1936 (Note: Cuenco only served for 3 days as Cebu Municipal President before being appointed Secretary of Public Works and Communications by President Manuel L. Quezon.)	None

=== City of Cebu ===
This is the list of mayors of Cebu City:

No. (Note: Numbers are counted based on the amount of individuals who have served as Mayor, rather than the amount of terms or administrations. Officials temporarily serving as Acting Mayor due to the absence (e.g. suspension) of the elected mayor, who revert to their original offices afterwards, are not counted.)	Image	Mayor Lifespan	Party (Note: A two-party system between the Nacionalistas and Liberals was in place from the postwar period (1946) up until the Marcos dictatorship, which was dominated by Marcos's Kilusang Bagong Lipunan (KBL). After his overthrow in the 1986 EDSA Revolution, a multi-party system emerged which remains in place until the present; local politics revolves around local alliances, which commonly change national political parties with every new Presidential administration.)	Term	Vice Mayor Party
Appointive position (1936–1955)
1		Alfredo V. Jacinto^{2} 1891–1973	Independent	January 7, 1937 – November 26, 1938	—N/a
2		Vicente Rama; 1887–1956 (aged 69)	Nacionalista	November 26, 1938 – August 2, 1940	—N/a
3		Jose Delgado	KALIBAPI	August 3, 1940 – April 10, 1942	—N/a
4		Juan Cerilles Zamora; 1906–1966 (aged 59-60)	KALIBAPI	1942 – 1944	—N/a
5		Leandro Aballe Tojong; 1905–1980 (aged 75)	Nacionalista	1945; Appointed by Sergio Osmeña – 1945	—N/a
6		Nicolas Gandionco Escario; 1898–1958 (aged 59)	Nacionalista	1945; Appointed by Sergio Osmeña – 1946	—N/a
7		Vicente Stuart del Rosario; 1905–1987 (aged 81-82)	Liberal	1946; Appointed by Manuel Roxas – 1947	—N/a
8		Luis Veloso Espina	Liberal	May 27, 1947; Appointed by Manuel Roxas – September 5, 1947	—N/a
9		Miguel Garces Raffiñan; 1891–?	Liberal	September 6, 1947; Appointed by Manuel Roxas – August 15, 1951	Arsenio R. Villanueva (removed June 9, 1952)
10		Pedro Bernal Elizalde; 1890–1981 (aged 90-91)	Liberal	August 18, 1951; Appointed by Elpidio Quirino – July 23, 1952	Arsenio R. Villanueva (removed June 9, 1952)
10		Pedro Bernal Elizalde; 1890–1981 (aged 90-91)	Liberal	August 18, 1951; Appointed by Elpidio Quirino – July 23, 1952	Carlos Jurado Cuizon; Liberal
11		Jose Chiong Veloso Rodriguez; 1906–?	Liberal	November 9, 1952; Appointed by Elpidio Quirino – March 26, 1953	Carlos Jurado Cuizon; Liberal
(7)		Vicente Stuart del Rosario; 1905–1987 (aged 81-82)	Liberal	April 9, 1953; Appointed by Elpidio Quirino – December 6, 1953	Carlos Jurado Cuizon; Liberal
(11)		Jose Chiong Veloso Rodriguez; 1906–?	Liberal	December 7, 1953; Reinstated by the Supreme Court – November 16, 1955	Carlos Jurado Cuizon; Liberal
(11)		Jose Chiong Veloso Rodriguez; 1906–?	Liberal	December 7, 1953; Reinstated by the Supreme Court – November 16, 1955	Florentino D. Tecson (from January 28, 1954)
12		Pedro B. Clavano; 1907–?	Nacionalista	November 17, 1955; Appointed by Ramon Magsaysay – December 30, 1955	Florentino D. Tecson (from January 28, 1954)
Elective position (1956–present)
13		Sergio Veloso Osmeña Jr. 1916–1984 (aged 67)	Liberal	December 30, 1955 – September 12, 1957; Elected to Congress	Ramon Gonzales Duterte; Liberal
14		Ramon Gonzales Duterte; 1901–1971 (aged 69)	Liberal	September 12, 1957 – December 30, 1959	Ramon Abasolo Abellanosa
(13)		Sergio Veloso Osmeña Jr. 1916–1984 (aged 67)	Nacionalista	December 30, 1959 – January 1, 1960; Elected to Congress	Carlos Jurado Cuizon; Nacionalista
15		Carlos Jurado Cuizon; 1909–1989 (aged 79-80)	Nacionalista	January 1, 1960 – September 18, 1963	Mario Diez Ortiz
16		Mario Diez Ortiz; 1922–2015 (aged 93)	Nacionalista	September 18, 1963 – December 30, 1963	—N/a
(13)		Sergio Veloso Osmeña Jr. 1916–1984 (aged 67)	Liberal	December 30, 1963 – September 16, 1965; Elected Senator	Carlos Jurado Cuizon; Liberal
(15)		Carlos Jurado Cuizon; 1909–1989 (aged 79-80)	Liberal	September 16, 1965 – December 30, 1967	Luis Villamor Diores; Liberal → Nacionalista
(13)		Sergio Veloso Osmeña Jr. 1916–1984 (aged 67)	Liberal	December 30, 1967 – January 3, 1968	Eulogio Enriquez Borres; Liberal
17		Eulogio Enriquez Borres; 1917–2008 (aged 88-89)	Liberal	January 3, 1968 – September 13, 1971; Resigned to run for election	John Henry Renner Osmeña; Liberal (until December 30, 1969)
18		Florencio S. Urot; 1904–1975 (aged 70-71)	Liberal	September 13, 1971 – December 31, 1971	Jose Chiong Veloso Rodriguez; Liberal
(13)		Sergio Veloso Osmeña Jr. 1916–1984 (aged 67)	Liberal	December 31, 1971 – September 17, 1972; Exiled by the Marcos dictatorship	Eulogio Enriquez Borres; Liberal
(17)		Eulogio Enriquez Borres; 1917–2008 (aged 88-89)	Panaghiusa	September 17, 1972; Succeeded as Mayor – October 16, 1978	—N/a
19		Florentino Sanico Solon; 1931–2020 (aged 88)	KBL	October 16, 1978; Appointed by Marcos – 1983; Appointed Deputy Minister of Health	Eulogio Enriquez Borres (until December 31, 1980); Panaghiusa
19		Florentino Sanico Solon; 1931–2020 (aged 88)	KBL	October 16, 1978; Appointed by Marcos – 1983; Appointed Deputy Minister of Health	Ronald Regis Duterte (from December 31, 1980); KBL
20		Ronald Regis Duterte^{3} 1934–2016 (aged 82)	KBL	1983; Succeeded as Mayor – March 25, 1986; Post-EDSA forced resignation (Note: Following the 1986 EDSA Revolution, President Corazon Aquino forced the resignation of all local government heads and appointed Officers in Charge (OICs) in their place to serve until the 1988 elections.)	Vicente Alcazaren Kintanar Jr. KBL
21		John Henry Renner Osmeña^{3} 1935–2021 (aged 86)	Liberal	March 25, 1986; Appointed OIC – March 19, 1987; Resigned to run for Senator (Note: Appointed OICs serving between the 1986 EDSA Revolution and the 1988 elections had to resign from their positions when running for a full term in any elective office, including for offices which they held as OICs.)	Jose Veloso Cuenco; Panaghiusa
22		Jose Veloso Cuenco^{3}	Panaghiusa	March 19, 1987; Appointed OIC – November 27, 1987; Resigned to run for Mayor	Augusto Wong Go; Panaghiusa
23		Antonio Rodriguez Veloso^{3} 1930–2026 (aged 96)	Independent	November 27, 1987; Appointed OIC – February 2, 1988 (Presidential Term non-87' Concon)	Joseph Sy Gaisano
24		Tomas dela Rama Osmeña b. July 26, 1948 (age 78)	Lakas; Local: BOPK	February 2, 1988 (Presidential Term non-87' Concon) – June 30, 1995	Alvin Biaño Garcia; Lakas / BOPK
25		Alvin Biaño Garcia b. June 29, 1946 (age 80)	PROMDI; Local: BOPK	June 30, 1995 – June 30, 2001	Renato Veloso Osmeña Sr. PROMDI → KAMPI; BOPK → KUSUG
25		Alvin Biaño Garcia b. June 29, 1946 (age 80)	KAMPI; Local: KUSUG	June 30, 1995 – June 30, 2001	Renato Veloso Osmeña Sr. PROMDI → KAMPI; BOPK → KUSUG
(24)		Tomas dela Rama Osmeña b. July 26, 1948 (age 78)	PROMDI (2001–2004) Lakas (2004–2009) Liberal (2009–2010); Local: BOPK	June 30, 2001 – June 30, 2010	Michael Lopez Rama; PROMDI → Lakas → Liberal; BOPK
26		Michael Lopez Rama b. October 28, 1954 (age 71)	Liberal; Local: BOPK	June 30, 2010 – June 30, 2013	Joy Augustus Go Young; Liberal / BOPK
26		Michael Lopez Rama b. October 28, 1954 (age 71)	UNA; Local: Team Rama	June 30, 2013 – December 11, 2015; Suspended (Note: Vice Mayor Labella served as Acting Mayor, with Councilor Archival as Acting Vice Mayor, after the Office of the President suspended Mayor Rama for 60 days in 2015 due to illegal demolition of road projects.)	Edgardo Colina Labella; UNA / BARUG
—		Edgardo Colina Labella; Acting; 1951–2021 (aged 70)	UNA; Local: BARUG	December 11, 2015 – February 8, 2016	Nestor Dionson Archival Sr. Acting; Liberal / BOPK
(26)		Michael Lopez Rama b. October 28, 1954 (age 71)	UNA; Local: BARUG	February 8, 2016 – May 17, 2016; Suspended (Note: Councilor Margot Osmeña served as Acting Mayor, while Councilor Lea Ouano Japson served as Acting Vice Mayor, during the suspension of Mayor Rama, Vice Mayor Labella, and 12 other city councilors.)	Edgardo Colina Labella; UNA / BARUG
—		Margarita Vargas Osmeña; Acting b. July 25, 1949 (age 77)	Liberal; Local: BOPK	May 17, 2016 – June 30, 2016	Lea Ouano Japson; Acting; Liberal / BOPK
(24)		Tomas dela Rama Osmeña b. July 26, 1948 (age 78)	Liberal (2016–2018) LDP (2018–2019); Local: BOPK	June 30, 2016 – June 30, 2019	Edgardo Colina Labella; UNA → PDP-Laban; BARUG
27		Edgardo Colina Labella^{✝} 1951–2021 (aged 70)	PDP-Laban; Local: BARUG	June 30, 2019 – November 19, 2021; Died in office (Note: Mayor Labella died in office on November 19, 2024 following complications from pneumonia and sepsis. Vice Mayor Mike Rama succeeded as Mayor.)	Michael Lopez Rama; PDP-Laban / BARUG
(26)		Michael Lopez Rama b. October 28, 1954 (age 71)	PDP-Laban; Local: BARUG	November 20, 2021; Succeeded as Mayor – June 30, 2022	Donaldo Cabañes Hontiveros; PDP-Laban / BARUG
(26)		Michael Lopez Rama b. October 28, 1954 (age 71)	PDP-Laban; Local: BARUG	June 30, 2022 – October 3, 2024; Dismissed from office (Note: Mayor Rama was dismissed from office by the Ombudsman on October 3, 2024 after being suspended since May 8, 2024. Vice Mayor Raymond Alvin Garia succeeded as Mayor.)	Raymond Alvin Neri Garcia; PDP-Laban / KUSUG
—		Raymond Alvin Neri Garcia b. January 29, 1977 (age 49)	PDP-Laban (2022–2024) PFP (2024–2025); Local: KUSUG	May 8, 2024; Acting – October 3, 2024	Donaldo Cabañes Hontiveros; PDP-Laban / BARUG
28		Raymond Alvin Neri Garcia b. January 29, 1977 (age 49)	PDP-Laban (2022–2024) PFP (2024–2025); Local: KUSUG	October 3, 2024; Succeeded as Mayor – June 30, 2025	Donaldo Cabañes Hontiveros; PDP-Laban / BARUG
29		Nestor Dionson Archival b. June 2, 1958 (age 68)	Liberal; Local: BOPK	June 30, 2025 – Incumbent	Tomas dela Rama Osmeña; Liberal / BOPK

Notes

Designations
^{1} Inaugural Municipal mayor.
^{2} Inaugural City mayor.
^{3} Officer-in-charge (OIC).
^{✝} Died in office.

=== Timeline of elected city mayors (1986 to present) ===
By national party

By local political bloc (Note: Filipino local politicians more commonly campaign in their constituencies based on local parties and alliances, rather than on their national parties. It is also common for local parties and alliances to switch affiliations to another national party, especially following the election of a new President.)

== Vice Mayor of Cebu City ==
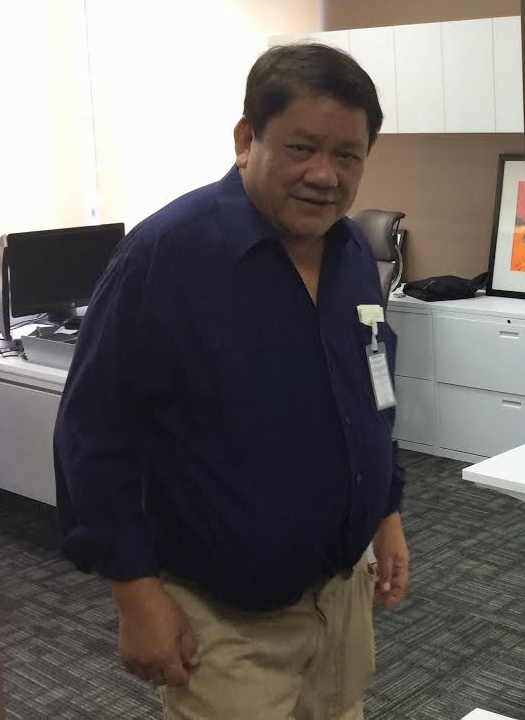
Vice Mayor Tomas Osmeña (2025–Present)

The vice mayor is the city's second-highest official, elected via popular vote. Although most mayoral candidates have running mates, the vice mayor is elected separately from the mayor. This sometimes results in the mayor and the vice mayor being elected from different political parties, as was the case most recently in 2016.

Republic Act No. 244, approved on June 12, 1948, established the position of vice mayor of the City of Cebu. It was to be appointed by the President of the Philippines with the consent of the Commission on Appointments. The first to be appointed vice mayor under the provisions of R.A. No. 244 was Arsenio Ruiz Villanueva, who took his oath of office on July 16, 1948.

One of the most significant amendments to the Charter of the City of Cebu (C.A. No. 58) came with the approval of Republic Act No. 1243 on June 7, 1955. This particular amendment provided for the election at large, by the city's qualified voters in conformity with the provisions of the Revised Election Code, of the city mayor and vice mayor. The first election for city mayor and vice mayor was held during the general election for provincial and municipal officials on November 8, 1955. Ramon Gonzales Duterte was chosen as Cebu City's first elected vice mayor.

In the Sangguniang Panlungsod—in this case, the Cebu City Council—the vice mayor serves as its presiding officer and may vote only to break a tie. The vice mayor also has the authority to appoint the employees of the council, subject to civil service rules and regulations. During temporary absences of the mayor, the vice mayor serves as acting mayor. In the event of a permanent vacancy in the office of the mayor before the end of the term, the vice mayor shall assume the office of mayor for the rest of the unexpired term, which most recently occurred in 2024 when vice mayor and Acting Mayor Raymond Alvin Garcia assumed office as mayor following the Ombudsman's dismissal from office of then-suspended Mayor Mike Rama.

As of 2021, the vice mayor is paid a monthly salary of ₱159,804 based on the second tranche of the Salary Standardization Law of 2019 signed on January 8, 2020 with the position being classified under Salary Grade 28 for highly urbanized cities like Cebu City.

Following the death of Mayor Edgardo Labella in 2021 and the dismissal of Rama in 2024, first-ranked councilor Donaldo "Dondon" Hontiveros became the first vice mayor of the city to assume office in two separate terms through succession, rather than election, due to the premature end of the incumbent mayor's term. Hontiveros ran in 2025 for a full term as vice mayor in his own right, but lost.

=== Current Vice Mayor ===
The incumbent vice mayor is Tomas "Tommy" R. Osmeña, the founder of BOPK and himself a former mayor from 1988 to 1995, 2001 to 2010, and 2016 to 2019. Osmeña was elected as Archival's running mate in the 2025 elections, defeating incumbent vice mayor Hontiveros (BARUG) and former city councilor and MCWD chairman Jose "Joey" Daluz III (KUSUG-Panaghiusa).

Osmeña, alongside Archival, took his ceremonial oath of office on June 26, 2025 and formally began his term as vice mayor on June 30.

== Elections ==
- 2001 Cebu City local elections
- 2004 Cebu City local elections
- 2007 Cebu City local elections
- 2010 Cebu City local elections
- 2013 Cebu City local elections
- 2016 Cebu City local elections
- 2019 Cebu City local elections
- 2022 Cebu City local elections
- 2025 Cebu City local elections
