= Jose Solon =

Cebu Provincial Board Member from 1928 to 1936 and Member of the First Cebu City Council

The Honourable Jose Solon

Member of Cebu Provincial Board
- In office 1928–1936

Jose Solon was a Filipino Visayan politician from Cebu, Philippines who served as Member of the Provincial Board of Cebu starting in 1928 until 1936 and was one of the member of the first Cebu City Council elected in 1937.

== Career ==
In 1928, Jose Solon was voted to the Cebu Provincial Board together with Buenaventura Rodriguez and served during the term of then Governor Arsenio Climaco. Reelected to the same government post in 1931, he once again served as provincial board member with Pastor B. Noel during the governorship of Mariano Jesus Cuenco until 1936. At various times, he would serve as acting governor of the province of Cebu for being a senior member of the board.

On December 14, 1937, he was voted to the newly created council of the charter city of Cebu, and the council was confirmed by then President Manuel L. Quezon issued on December 29, 1937 by virtue of Executive Order No. 133. Among those who were also part of the council were Regino Mercado, Felipe Pacaña, Jose P. Nolasco, Dr. Leandro A. Tojong, Jose Fortich, Juan Zamora, and Dominador Abella.

== Historical commemoration ==
- Formerly known as Kamagong Street, the Jose Solon Drive located in Barangay Lahug, Cebu City was named in his honor by virtue of City Ordinance No. 1157 enacted on October 25, 1983 and approved on November 4, 1983. It starts beside Lahug Elementary School from Gorordo Avenue to Escario Street.
