= Mario Ortiz (politician) =

Filipino politician and attorney lawyer

Mayor of Cebu City
- In office September 18, 1963 – December 30, 1963
- Preceded by: Carlos Cuizon
- Succeeded by: Sergio Osmeña Jr.

Vice Mayor of Cebu City
- In office January 1, 1960 – September 18, 1963
- Preceded by: Carlos Cuizon

Member of the Cebu City Council
- In office December 30, 1959 – January 1, 1960

Personal details
- Born: Mario Diez Ortiz; April 9, 1922 Sibonga, Cebu, Philippine Islands
- Died: July 31, 2015 (aged 93) Cebu City, Cebu
- Spouse: Julita Villacorta Ortiz
- Parents: Santos Ortiz Sr. (father); Bernarda Diez (mother)
- Profession: Lawyer, Politician

Mario Diez Ortiz (April 9, 1922 – July 31, 2015) was a Filipino politician and lawyer who served as the mayor of Cebu City from September to December 1963. Prior to becoming mayor, he was elected to serve as a member of the Cebu City Council in 1959 but abruptly assumed as vice mayor to Carlos Cuizon in 1960.

== Early life and education ==
Ortiz was born in Sibonga, Cebu to Santos Ortiz Sr. and Bernarda Diez. He attended classes at then Colegio de San Carlos and later took up his bachelor of laws at the University of Santo Tomas. At age 19, he became part of the Bohol Area Command under the command of Captain Casiano Cabagnot. On August 5, 1944, he was captured by the Japanese military police at then Cebu Normal School. He was then transferred to the Cebu Provincial Jail which now houses the Museo Sugbo. He, together with his cellmate Abdon del Mar and with the help of Jose "Dodong" Maramara, was able to escape from the jail while the guards were drunk. He was admitted to the Philippine Bar on March 31, 1948.

== Political career ==
He started his political career as a councilor after winning in the 1959 elections and garnered the highest number of votes. On January 1, 1960, Ortiz was elevated as vice mayor after newly elected vice mayor Carlo Cuizon assumed as mayor. As the latter ran for vice mayor in the 1963 elections, Ortiz took over as mayor from September 18, 1963, to December 31, 1963.

== Post-mayoral career ==
After his short stint as mayor, Ortiz was appointed in 1965 as judge of the Court of First Instance of Negros and later became a member of the board of directors of the Philippine National Bank.

With the support of president Ferdinand Marcos of the Nacionalista Party, he sought to reclaim his old post as mayor in the 1971 elections against then senator Sergio Osmeña Jr. who used to be his political ally. However, he lost with 27,512 votes against Osmeña's 59,934 votes.

On July 30, 1985, he was appointed as a commissioner of the Commission on Elections under the Marcos administration and was supposed to end his term on May 17, 1992. With the assumption of Corazon Aquino as president in 1986, Ortiz submitted his courtesy resignation thereby cutting short his tenure in office.

== Personal life ==
Ortiz was married to Julita "Lita" Villacorta, whom he met while they were detained by the Japanese during the Second World War. They had five children namely Reynaldo, Danilo, Jerome, Edwin and Julie Marie.

== Death ==
Ortiz died at the age of 93 on July 31, 2015.

Political offices
Preceded by Carlos Cuizon	Mayor of Cebu City; 1963	Succeeded by Sergio Osmeña Jr.
