= Florencio Urot =

Filipino politician and lawyer

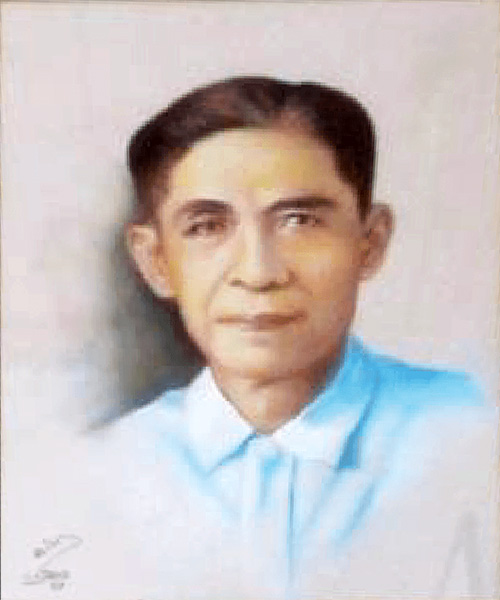

18th Mayor of Cebu City
- In office September 13, 1971 – December 31, 1971
- Vice Mayor: Jose V. Rodriguez
- Preceded by: Eulogio Borres
- Succeeded by: Sergio Osmeña Jr.

Member of the Cebu City Council
- In office December 10, 1940 – September 13, 1971

Personal details
- Born: 1904 Tabogon, Cebu, Philippine Islands
- Died: November 19, 1975
- Party: Liberal (1946–1957; 1961–1971)
- Other party: Nacionalista (1940–1946; 1957–1961)
- Occupation: Politician
- Profession: Lawyer

Florencio Urot (1904 – November 19, 1975) was a Filipino politician and lawyer who served as the 18th Mayor of Cebu City from September to December 1971. Prior to becoming mayor, he served as a member of the Cebu City Council from 1940 to 1971, as well as vice mayor (and the council's presiding officer) from 1965 to 1967.

Urot was born in Tabogon, Cebu. He later became a police chief of his town and pursued a law degree in college. After which, he moved to Cebu City where he was later elected as a member of the city council on December 10, 1940, along with seven other members. He went on to serve as city councilor for 35 years.

Urot was identified in a Supreme Court case as presiding officer of the council in 1966.

In 1971, Mayor Eulogio Borres and Vice Mayor John Henry Osmeña resigned from their respective positions as both sought other elective positions. This resulted in Urot, then first-ranked councilor becoming mayor on September 13, serving for 108 days until December 31, 1971, when Sergio Osmeña Jr. was once again elected Mayor.

Urot died on November 19, 1975. Less than a year from his death, the city council on June 14, 1976, enacted City Ordinance No. 941 renaming 8th Street in Cebu North Reclamation Area as Florencio Urot Street. A school in Mabolo, Cebu City was also named as Florencio Urot Memorial National High School by virtue of City Ordinance No. 1180 which was approved by then mayor Ronald Duterte on December 27, 1984. However, the school was renamed in 2010 into Mabolo National High School.

Political offices
Preceded by Eulogio Borres	Mayor of Cebu City; 1971	Succeeded by Sergio Osmeña Jr.
