= Joy Augustus Young =

Filipino politician

The Honorable Joy Augustus Young
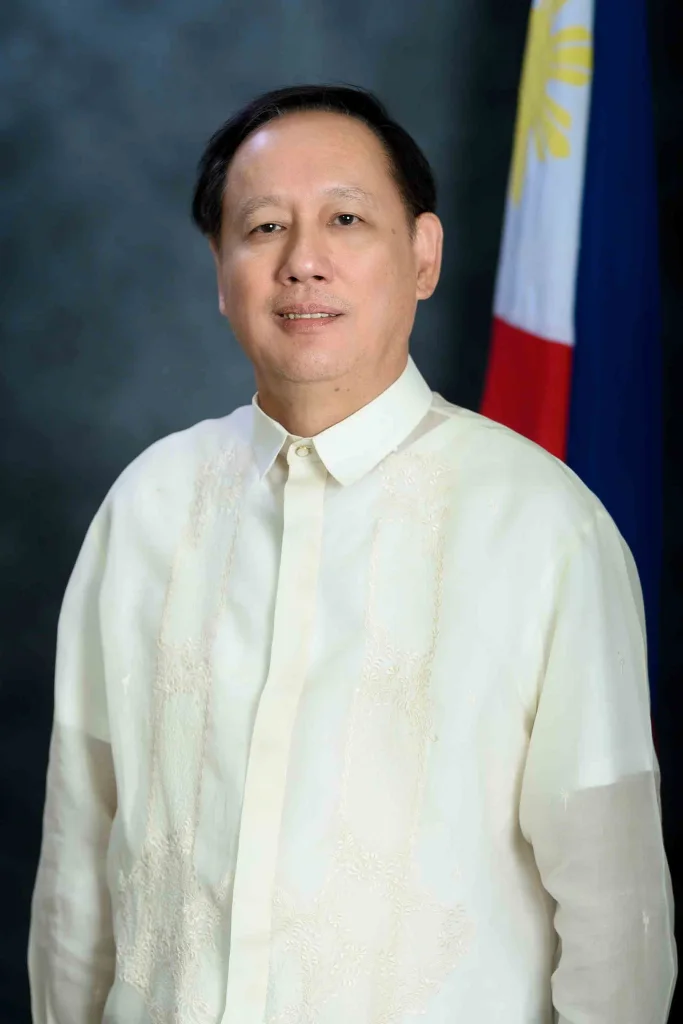
- Official portrait, 2022

Member of the Cebu City Council from the 1st district
- In office June 30, 2016 – June 30, 2025

Vice Mayor of Cebu City
- In office June 30, 2010 – June 30, 2013
- Mayor: Michael Rama
- Preceded by: Michael Rama
- Succeeded by: Edgardo Labella

Member of the Philippine House of Representatives for PROMDI
- In office June 30, 1998 – June 30, 2001

Personal details
- Born: Joy Augustus Go Young; August 13, 1956 (age 70) Cebu City, Philippines
- Party: BOPK (local; 2009–present); Liberal (national; 2009-2018; 2024–present)
- Other political affiliations: PROMDI (1998–2009); LDP (2018–2024)
- Education: University of San Carlos
- Profession: Politician

Joy Augustus Go Young (born August 13, 1956) is a Filipino politician who served as a member of the City Council from the 1st (North) District. He also previously served as Vice Mayor of Cebu City from 2010 to 2013 and Party-list Representative to Congress for PROMDI from 1998 to 2001.

Young also served as a consultant on education under Cebu City Mayor Tomas Osmeña.

Political offices
| Preceded by Michael Rama | Vice Mayor of Cebu City; 2010–2013 | Succeeded by Edgardo Labella |
