= Edgardo Labella =

Filipino politician and lawyer (1951–2021)

The Honorable Edgardo C. Labella
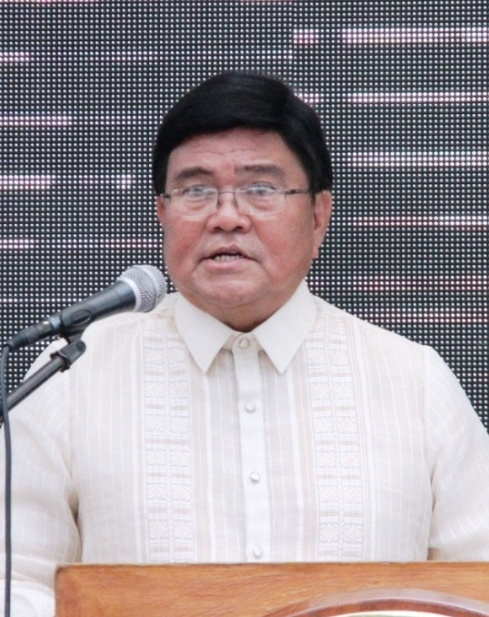
- Labella in 2019

Mayor of Cebu City
- In office June 30, 2019 – November 19, 2021
- Vice Mayor: Mike Rama
- Preceded by: Tomas Osmeña
- Succeeded by: Mike Rama
- In office December 11, 2015 – February 8, 2016; Acting
- Vice Mayor: Nestor Archival (Acting)
- Preceded by: Mike Rama
- Succeeded by: Mike Rama

Vice Mayor of Cebu City
- In office June 30, 2013 – June 30, 2019; Acting mayor: December 11, 2015 – February 8, 2016; Suspended: May 17, 2016 – June 30, 2016 (Note: During Labella's suspension, councilor Lea Ouano Japson was the acting vice mayor. Labella was then re-elected in the 2016 elections.)
- Mayor: Mike Rama (2013–2016); Tomas Osmeña (2016–2019)
- Preceded by: Joy Augustus Young
- Succeeded by: Mike Rama

Member of the Cebu City Council from the 1st district
- In office June 30, 2004 – June 30, 2013
- 2010–2013: Majority Leader
- In office June 30, 1998 – June 30, 2001

Personal details
- Born: Edgardo Colina Labella; May 22, 1951 Cebu City, Philippines
- Died: November 19, 2021 (aged 70) Cebu City, Philippines
- Party: BO-PK (local; 1998–2012); Liberal (2010–2012); Barug (local; 2012–2021); UNA (2012–2016); PDP–Laban (2016–2021)
- Spouse: Joycelyn Nicolas Labella
- Children: 2
- Education: University of the Visayas (BA); University of San Carlos (LLB)
- Profession: Lawyer; politician
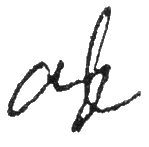
- Signature
- Nickname(s): Edgar Labella; EdLab

Edgardo Colina Labella (Tagalog: [ɛdˈɡaɾdo laˈbɛlja]; May 22, 1951 – November 19, 2021) was a Filipino politician and lawyer who served as the mayor of Cebu City from 2019 until his death in 2021. Prior to becoming mayor, he was the city's vice mayor from 2013 to 2019 and was a member of the Cebu City Council from 1998 to 2001 and again from 2004 to 2013.

Before entering politics, he was a lawyer for the Office of the Ombudsman.

== Early life and education ==
Labella is a native of Barangay Mabolo, Cebu City. His father, Eugene Labella, was a director of Visayan films and had served as regional director in Central Visayas of the Ministry of Public Information. His mother, Esterlina Colina Labella, was an actress. He completed his elementary education at Mabolo Elementary School in 1963 and secondary education in 1967 at the University of the Visayas where he also earned his bachelor's degree in political science in 1971. He then took up Bachelor of Laws at the University of San Carlos from 1973 to 1977, and was admitted to the Integrated Bar of the Philippines in 1978.

== Legal career ==
Labella started as an associate of Cabahug Law Office in 1978 and later became a legal officer of the Complaints and Investigation Office under the Office of the President. He was then promoted to Junior Presidential Staff Officer in the same office and concurrently became a legal consultant of the National Institute of Science and Technology.

In March 1980, Labella was designated as legal officer in the Office of the Tanodbayan and was promoted to trial attorney in September 1983. He then became a Special Prosecutor from April 1983 to November 1986. He was appointed Director of the Office of the Ombudsman-Visayas from 1994 to 1998.

== Political career ==
=== Councilor, 1998–2001 and 2004–2013 ===
Labella started his political career as a councilor for the Cebu City 1st (north) district in the Cebu City Council in 1998. He ran under Bando Osmeña – Pundok Kauswagan (BOPK). He then returned to his old post in 2004 and served until 2013 where he also became the Majority Floor Leader in the 12th Sangguniang Panlungsod.

=== Vice mayor, 2013–2019 ===
On February 28, 2012, Labella, together with two other Cebu City councilors Jose Daluz III and Ronald Cuenco, declared their support to then Mayor Mike Rama who left BOPK in 2011. He accepted the offer of Rama to be his candidate for vice mayor in the 2013 elections where he defeated the incumbent vice mayor Joy Augustus Young of BOPK by 184 votes.

==== First term (2013–2016) ====
As presiding officer of the 13th Sangguniang Panlungsod, Labella started with only four allied councilors namely Mary Ann de los Santos, David Tumulak, Nendell Hanz Abella and James Anthony Cuenco. Several months after the 2013 barangay elections, Tisa barangay captain Phillip Zafra was elected as president of Liga ng mga Barangay-Cebu City Chapter making him an ex-officio member in the Cebu City Council.

Labella became acting mayor of Cebu City on December 11, 2015, after Mayor Mike Rama was placed under 60-day preventive suspension from the Office of the President in relation to the 2014 demolition of a concrete island and lamppost project in Barangay Labangon. Then-councillor Nestor Archival became acting vice mayor of Cebu City.

Labella ran for re-election in the 2016 elections and won by a wider margin of 29,864 votes against Archival of BOPK.

On May 17, 2016, he was suspended, together with Rama and 12 councilors, for "grave abuse of authority" in relation to the release of calamity assistance in 2013.

==== Second term (2016–2019) ====
Labella's running mate Rama lost to Tomas Osmeña in the 2016 elections. On June 30, 2016, he and his 10 allied councilors took their oath of office before Adlaon barangay captain Nieves Narra at Rama Compound. With the new administration's refusal to participate in Mega Cebu project by the Metro Cebu Development and Coordinating Board (MCDCB), Osmeña warned Labella not to represent Cebu City in the said undertaking.

He joined the ruling party PDP–Laban on August 26, 2016, together with some political allies.

=== Mayor, 2019–2021 ===
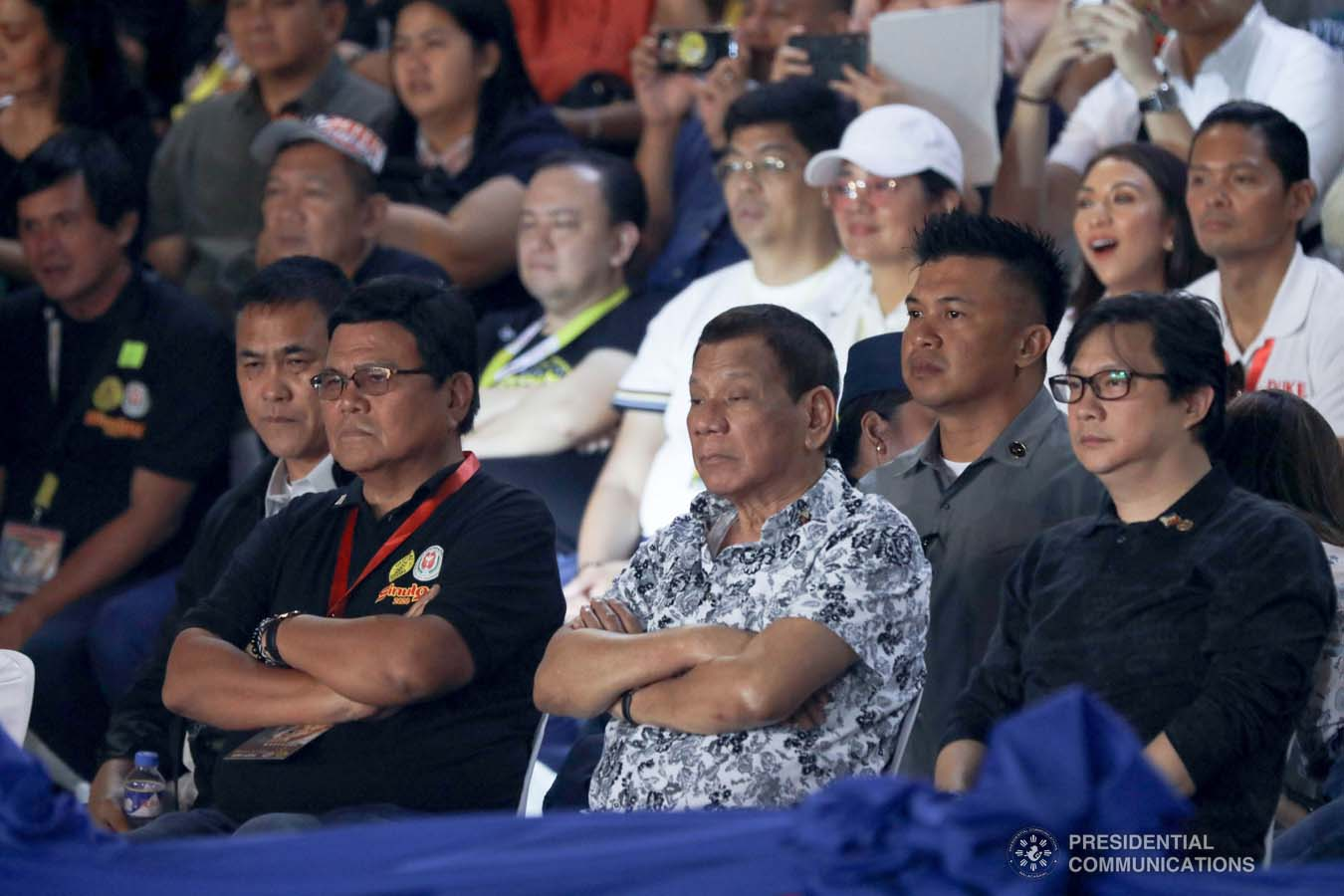
Labella joins President Rodrigo Duterte in the 40th Sinulog Festival celebration at the Cebu City Sports Center Grandstand.

In July 2018, Labella, who does not come from a political family, officially declared his intention to run for mayor of Cebu City against incumbent mayor Tomas Osmeña while former mayor Mike Rama also signified his intention to reclaim his old post. It was feared that if both Labella and Rama had run for the same position, this would have split their group, BARUG Team Rama. On August 30, 2018, Rama officially announced his decision to run for vice mayor and gave way to Labella who was then the incumbent vice mayor. They were later endorsed by President Rodrigo Duterte as PDP–Laban's official candidates in Cebu City. Labella went on to defeat Osmeña by 18,925 votes in the 2019 elections.

He was elected as the national chairman of the League of Cities of the Philippines (LCP) on July 19, 2019.

After calling Isla dela Victoria, a proposed integrated resorts and casino project of Universal Hotels and Resorts Inc. (UHRI) in Kawit Island, as "disadvantageous" to Cebu City when he was still vice mayor, he reversed his position when UHRI decided to increase its investment in the joint venture project with the city from PHP 18 billion to PHP 25 billion. He has indicated that he would not stop the development since the cases filed to stop it were already dismissed. However, he has not allowed UHRI to reclaim the adjacent shore of the site since it would make the reclaimed area a property of UHRI.

Similar to what incumbent vice mayor Rama did during his term as mayor, Labella occupied the ground floor of the Cebu City Hall annex building as the Mayor's Office saying that "it will be easier for the Cebuanos to see" him. Their predecessor, Tomas Osmeña, previously occupied the 8th floor of the said building.

He was appointed by President Rodrigo Duterte as chairman of the Regional Peace and Order Council (RPOC) in Central Visayas October 28, 2019.

== Controversies ==
=== Sinulog 2019 fiasco ===
On August 23, 2019, through an executive order, he created the Sinulog Governing Board which aims to oversee the cultural and religious activities for Sinulog, an annual festival held on the third Sunday of January in Cebu City. This prompted vice mayor Rama, who was serving as Chairman of the Sinulog Foundation, Inc. (SFI), to question the creation of the said body as it would threaten the autonomy of SFI. Rama eventually resigned as its chairman on October 29, 2019.

When the news broke out about the restriction of live video coverage for the Sinulog grand parade and showdown after SFI entered into a ₱800,000-worth agreement granting MyTV exclusive broadcast rights, Labella immediately ordered its cancellation and assured other media groups that there will be no exclusivity to the said event.

Labella had to also clarify that other food companies were allowed to sell their products along the Sinulog grand parade route after it was reported that SFI entered into another exclusive agreement worth ₱2 million with San Miguel Food Inc. (SMFI).

=== Detention of Bambi Beltran ===
On April 18, 2020, local artist Maria Victoria "Bambi" Beltran posted a satirical Facebook status about the rapid rise of COVID-19 cases in Cebu City: "9,000+ new cases ... in one day. We are now the epicenter in the whole solar system." Labella responded, calling her post "fake news", and added: "Just wait Ms. Beltran, you'll soon be caught by the PNP Cybercrime Unit. You'll really be thrown in prison." Beltran deleted the post but was arrested without a warrant later that night. Labella visited Beltran in detention but denied he had anything to do with the arrest.

Beltran was charged with violating the Cybercrime Prevention Act and the Bayanihan to Heal as One Act for allegedly "spreading false information" about the COVID-19 pandemic. She was released on bail after three nights in detention, and then countersued Labella and the police officers for allegedly violating the Custodial Investigation Law (R.A. 7438) by arresting her without a warrant. Human rights advocates, including Human Rights Watch and the Commission on Human Rights, expressed concern over the incident. The Asian Forum for Human Rights and Development (FORUM-ASIA) called for the government to "respect the freedom of expression". In September, a Cebu City court dismissed all charges against Beltran, ruling that her satirical post was a form of speech protected by the constitution. The court also ruled that Beltran's arrest violated her constitutional rights. Labella respected the decision of the court.

=== COVID-19 response ===
In June 2020, Cebu City's inadequate management and response to COVID-19 led to more than 5,500 cases which resulted in it being called the epicenter of COVID-19 in the Philippines. This led President Rodrigo Duterte to appoint Department of Environment and Natural Resources secretary Roy Cimatu to oversee the government response in Cebu City. Presidential Peace Adviser Carlito Galvez Jr., chief implementer of the National Task Force (NTF) on COVID-19, bared that Cebu City was the new COVID-19 epicenter.

Cimatu called out the local government's response led by Labella such as the existence of barangay isolation centers which he suspected to have caused the increased community transmission and the proposal on constructing a new burial site for COVID-19 deaths.

On June 23, 2020, upon the pronouncement of the Central Visayas police and order from the Department of the Interior and Local Government, Labella cancelled all existing quarantine passes used in Cebu City with the aim of reducing the number of people roaming around the city. New quarantine passes were later issued by the city government but had several issues such as their size, their non-functional unique QR code and residents who have not received their quarantine pass.

After getting the public and private support, Labella led a major revamp in addressing COVID-19 in the city and finally flattening the curve. Cebu City has closed 49 village isolation centers. As of October 2020, the city registered zero COVID-19-related deaths.

== Personal life ==
Labella was married to Joycelyn Nicolas Labella. They have two sons: Edgardo II ("Jaypee") and Eugene Philippe.

Labella was one of the survivors of the 1998 sinking of the passenger ferry MV Princess of the Orient that sailed from Manila to Cebu during Typhoon Vicki where 150 of the 388 passengers perished. He stayed afloat for 36 hours clad in a life vest until he was found by rescuers.

He was also a regular runner at the Cebu City Sports Center as a member of the Walk and Talk Club.

=== Illness and death ===
Labella was diagnosed with prostate cancer around 2009. He underwent surgery and treatment, and the cancer was declared "under control". In 2021, he was hospitalized four times and went on medical leave seven times. In January, he was treated for an ear infection. In May, he was admitted due to "slight pneumonia" and was later diagnosed with sepsis. He later divulged that he "almost died" that time. In July, he underwent intensive care due to another bout of pneumonia, and in August, he suffered a mild stroke.

On September 20, Labella filed for a sick leave scheduled to end on October 7. However, on October 8, his leave became indefinite. He was then admitted to a hospital on October 30 due to pneumonia and minor sepsis and was put under intensive care. Labella died at Perpetual Succour Hospital on November 19 at the age of 70. The cause of death was septic shock secondary to pneumonia.

Labella had a seven-day wake, with the last three days held at Cebu City Hall for public viewing. He was buried with full military honors on November 26 at Golden Haven Memorial Park in Barangay Binaliw, Cebu City.

== Awards ==
- 2010: Prolife Recognition Award by the Human Life International
- 2010: The Archdiocese of Cebu's Humanae Vitae Award
- 2019: Outstanding Visayanian (University of the Visayas)

== Notes ==
Political offices
Preceded by Joy Augustus Young	Vice Mayor of Cebu City; 2013–2019	Succeeded by Michael Rama
Preceded by Tomas Osmeña	Mayor of Cebu City; 2019–2021	Succeeded by Michael Rama
