= Nicolas Escario =

Filipino Visayan physician, educator, and legislator from Cebu, Philippines

The Honorable Nicolas Gandiongco Escario
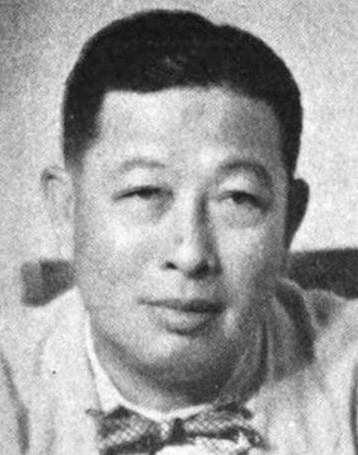
- Escario official portrait during the 3rd Congress.

Mayor of Cebu City
- In office 1945–1946
- Preceded by: Leandro Tojong
- Succeeded by: Vicente S. Del Rosario

Member of the House of the Representatives for Cebu 7th District
- In office 1950–1957
- Preceded by: Jose Rodriguez
- Succeeded by: Antonio De Pio

Personal details
- Born: December 2, 1898 Bantayan, Cebu
- Died: November 1, 1958 (aged 59)
- Party: Liberal
- Education: Colegio de San Carlos; Ateneo de Manila; University of Santo Tomas
- Profession: Physician; Educator

Nicolas Gandiongco Escario (December 2, 1898 – November 1, 1958) was a Filipino Visayan physician, educator, and legislator from Cebu, Philippines. He served as Mayor of Cebu City, member of the Cebu provincial board, and member of the House of Representatives (1950–1957). In 1946, he founded Cebu Institute of Technology.

== Early life ==
Nicolas G. Escario was the son of Gregorio Escario and Victoria Gandiongco in Bantayan, Cebu on December 2, 1898. His father Gregorio was municipal president. He studied at the Colegio de San Carlos (now University of San Carlos), acquired his bachelor's degree at Ateneo de Manila in 1918, and University of Santo Tomas where he graduated with a degree in medicine in 1923.

== Personal life ==
Married to Socorro Lizares who hailed from wealthy Negros-based family of sugar barons, he had three children: Gregorio, Nicolas Jr., and Maria Socorro.

== Career ==
From 1924 until 1928, he started his career practicing medicine at the Southern Islands Hospital as senior resident physician. Later, he was appointed physician of the Central Azucarera del Danao in Toboso, Negros Occidental.

=== Cebu Institute of Technology – University ===
In 1946, together with United States-trained engineers Fidel C. Dagani, Amancio A. Alcordo, and Jose A. Cavan, he founded the Cebu Institute of Technology and became its first ever president. The school's goal was to make college education available to students from Visayas and Mindanao.

=== Cebu government ===
In the aftermath of World War II in 1946, he became member of the Cebu provincial board. He would later become the mayor of Cebu City by the appointment of the Osmeña administration from 1945 until 1946. The biggest challenge of his term was to restore the city and the local government with diminished public funds. He spent his own personal money to pay for government employees. Vicente S. Del Rosario succeeded him on May 26, 1946.

=== Congress ===
As a candidate for the Liberal Party, he was elected member of the 2nd Congress of the Republic in 1950, receiving the biggest majority votes among Liberal candidates. He was reelected for another term at the 3rd Congress of the Republic on November 10, 1953, serving Cebu's 7th district until 1957. He was a member of the Committee on Appropriations, Committee on Education, Committee on health, and Committee on War Veterans.

== Historical commemoration ==
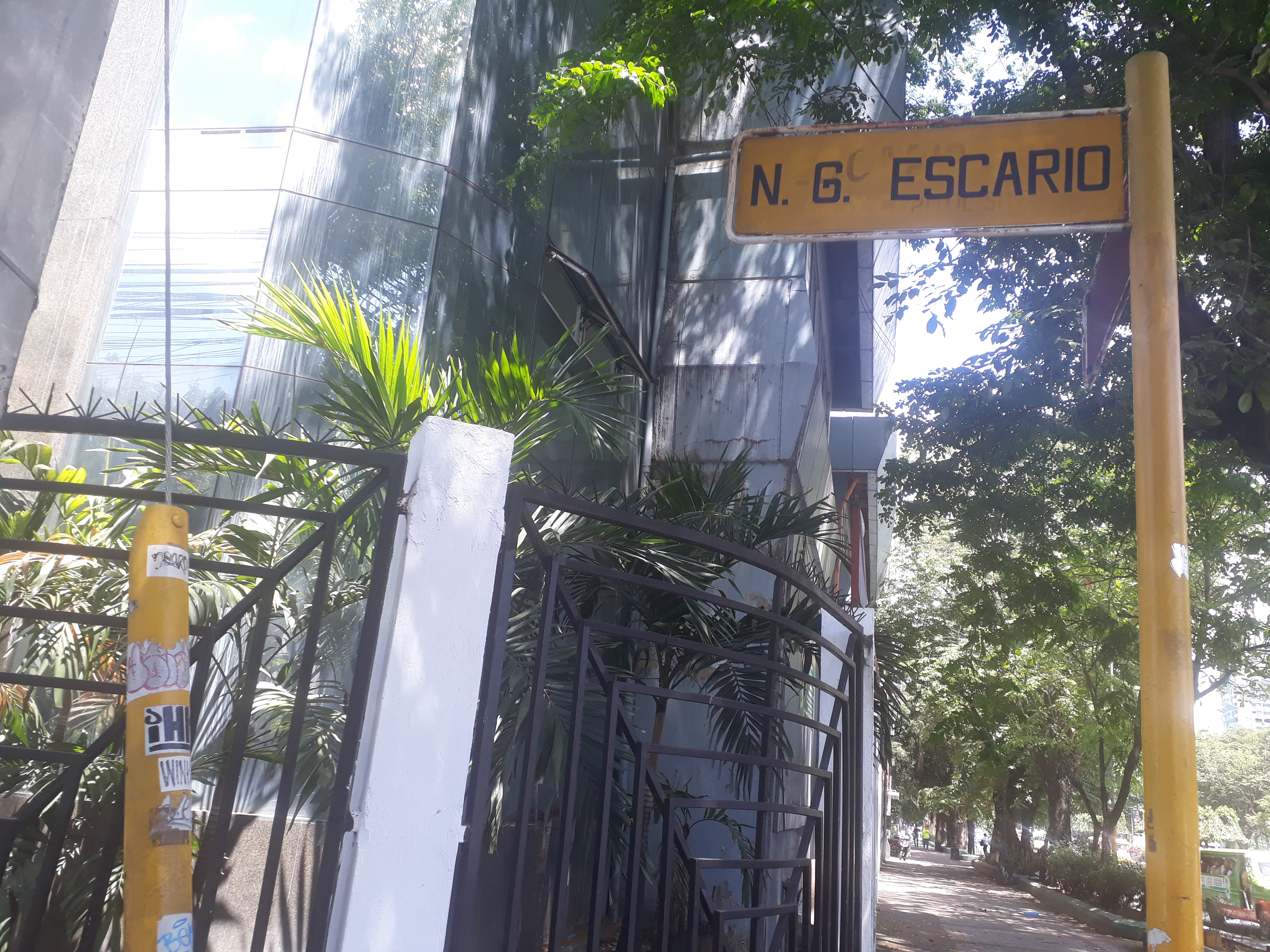
- Street sign of Nicolas G. Escario
  The street previously known as Waling Waling was renamed Nicolas Escario Street in his honor. It is located along the Cebu Provincial Capitol and extends until the intersection of Jakosalem Extension and Gorordo Avenue.
