= Leandro Tojong =

Filipino Visayan medical doctor, Cebu City Mayor, and Congressman from 1946-1953

The Honorable Leandro Tojong
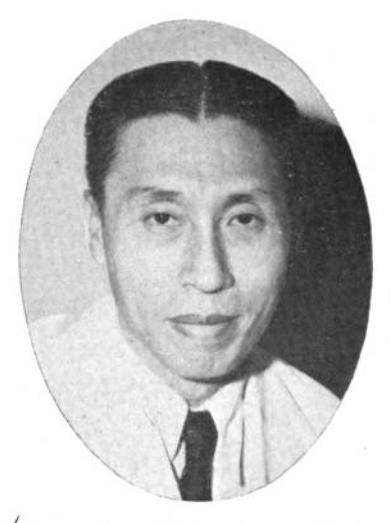

Member of the Philippine House of Representatives for Cebu's 2nd district
- In office December 30, 1949 – December 6, 1952
- Preceded by: Miguel Cuenco
- Succeeded by: Miguel Cuenco

Member of the Philippine House of Representatives for Cebu's 5th district
- In office May 25, 1946 – December 30, 1949
- Preceded by: Vicente Logarta
- Succeeded by: Vicente Logarta

Mayor of Cebu City
- In office 1945–1946
- Preceded by: Juan Zamora
- Succeeded by: Nicolas Escario

Personal details
- Born: March 13, 1905 Ginatilan, Cebu, Philippine Islands
- Died: December 20, 1980 (aged 75) Cebu City, Philippines
- Party: Liberal
- Education: Coelgio de San Carlos (AB); University of Santo Tomas (MD)
- Profession: Medical Doctor, Soldier, Politician

Leandro Aballe Tojong (March 13, 1905 – December 20, 1980) was a Filipino Visayan physician, patriot, and politician from Cebu, Philippines. He held the rank of Captain in the resistance movement against the Japanese, and later became Mayor of Cebu City (1945–1946), and a member of the House of Representatives (1946–1953).

== Early life ==
Leandro Aballe Tojong was born in Ginatilan, Cebu on March 13, 1905.

== Career ==
A medical doctor by profession, Leandro Tojong established a hospital that was named after him.

=== City Council ===
Tojong was one of the members of the council who were sworn into office by then Secretary of Interior, Elpidio Quirino, upon the inauguration of the new Cebu City Charter on February 24, 1937.

On December 14, 1937, he was a member of the first elected Cebu City Council. He was again elected to the Council for another term on December 10, 1940.

=== World War II ===
During World War II, he was part of the resistance movement and given the rank of captain. His designation was at the 87th Regiment, 3rd Battalion's base hospital in Barili and Dumanjug. Later, he was commissioned as the unit's Assistant Civil Affairs Officer.

=== Post-war ===
After the war, Leandro Tojong was the first Mayor of Cebu City appointed after the war by Sergio Osmeña in 1945, succeeding Juan Zamora. He was replaced later by Nicolas Escario a year after.

In 1946, he was voted as member of the 1st Congress of the Republic in 1946 for old 5th legislative district of Cebu, which was composed of the towns of Alegria, Badian, Boljoon, Ginatilan, Malabuyoc, Moalboal, Oslob, Samboan, Alcantara, and Santander. On January 13, 1947, President Manuel Roxas appointed him as Member of the National Defense Committee of the House of Representatives when the Council of National Defense was created.

As a candidate for the Liberal Party, he was elected Congressman of the 2nd Congress of the Republic for the old 2nd district that comprised the municipalities of Cebu, Liloan, Mandaue, Opon (now Lapu-lapu City), Cordova, Compostela and Consolacion in 1949. He served until 1953. However, he was unseated by the Vicente Logarta of the Nacionalista Party by virtue of the ruling by the House Electoral Tribunal on December 6, 1952.

Tojong later constructed and managed the famous "Tojong Hospital" along Governor Dionisio Jakosalem Street. He died on December 20, 1980, at the age of 75.

== Historical commemoration ==
- Dr. Leandro Tojong Street in Lahug, Cebu City was named in his honor by virtue of City Ordinance No. 1194 enacted in 1985.
