= Florentino Tecson =

Filipino Visayan politician and writer (1906–1962)

The Honorable Florentino D. Tecson

Vice Mayor of Cebu City
- In office January 28, 1954 – 1955
- Preceded by: Carlos Cuizon
- Succeeded by: Ramon Duterte

Personal details
- Born: March 16, 1906 Naga, Cebu
- Died: September 11, 1962 (aged 56)
- Education: Cebu High School
- Profession: Lawyer; Editor; Publisher; Author

Florentino D. Tecson (March 16, 1906 – September 11, 1962) was a Filipino Visayan lawyer, politician, editor, writer, and labor leader from Cebu, Philippines. He edited pre-war Cebuano periodicals such as Bag-ong Kusog and published his own newspaper, Ang Mamumuo, and a book of fiction, Lingawon Ko Ikaw. A known labor leader, he was the president of Federacion Obrero de Filipinas. He served as councilor of Naga and Cebu City and was appointed as Vice Mayor of Cebu City (1954–1955).

== Early life ==
Florentino Tecson was born in Naga, Cebu on March 16, 1906. He attended at the Cebu High School (now Abellana National School) and became a lawyer on April 14, 1953.

== Career ==
=== Editor ===
While studying at the Cebu High School, he worked as compositor for Vicente Rama's Bag-ong Kusog, a Cebuano periodical. He later became its reporter and editor. Other pre-war Cebuano papers he edited were Ang Tigmantala, Nasud (which was printed from 1930 to 1941) and his own newspaper, Ang Mamumuo.

=== Writer ===
A respected Cebuano writer, he wrote under various pseudonyms including D' Ville, Victor Kutsero, F.D.T., F. Lorentino, Victor Florentin, and Tinoy-od. He also won first prize in a literary contest by Bisaya magazine for his short story, Mga Kasingkasing Dagku (Magnificent Heart). In addition, he translated Victor Hugo's Les Miserables. Lingawon Ko Ikaw, his only published book of fiction, was a collection of 17 short stories that demonstrated realism and displayed his adept handling of stories of the rural life. While he criticized figures of society such as landlords, spouse, and politicians for their excess, absence or abuse, he lent the narrative with humor and depicted the poor in sympathetic light without being anti-capitalist.

=== Labor movement ===
Tecson was also known as a labor leader. He first got involved with the labor movement when he conducted a press coverage of an ongoing maritime workers' strike in 1934. He then became the auditor, vice president and president of the Federacion Obrero de Filipinas. Its other leaders included Jose Ma. Nava, Manuel Palacios, Zacarias Semenio and Jesus Ma. Nava. On June 29, 1939, he was the group's delegate to national convention of labor unions in the country that was held in Manila Grand Opera House, and then he was elected as member of the convention's presidium. Later, he formed his owned labor union called the Philippine Labor Federation.

=== Politics ===
Like his contemporaries, journalism led him to politics. Earlier newspapermen like Vicente Rama, Vicente Sotto, and Sergio Osmeña belonged to the ilustrado class and were voted in elective government positions due to their influence on the reading public. More writers from middle class background like Tecson followed suit. He once served as councilor of the municipality of Naga, and then later he was elected member of the council of Cebu City on December 10, 1940. On July 17, 1943, in the midst of World War II, he again was appointed and served in the same post as Member of the City Board of Cebu. After the war, he assumed the same position in the City Board together with Honorata Hermosisima, Cecilio de la Victoria, Florencio Urot, Juan Zamora, Ramon Abellanosa, Numeriano Estenzo, and Alfonso Frias.

On January 28, 1954, he was appointed Vice Mayor of Cebu City, succeeding Carlos Cuizon. When the charter of City of Cebu was amended on June 8, 1955, the positions Mayor and Vice Mayor were no longer appointive and instead were filled through election. Tecson was replaced by the first elected Vice Mayor, Ramon Duterte.

== Later years ==
He died on September 11, 1962.

== Historical commemoration ==
- Previously known as San Jose Extension, the Florentino D. Tecson Street in Cebu City was named in his honor by virtue of the City Ordinance No. 1882. It starts from Gorordo Avenue and ends at Rahman Street in Barangay Kamputhaw.

== Published works ==
For a list of published works, please read his entry in the Cebuano Studies Center.

=== Book ===
- Lingawon Ko Ikaw: Hugpong sa mga Sugilanon
