= Cebu City Hall =

Government building in the Philippines

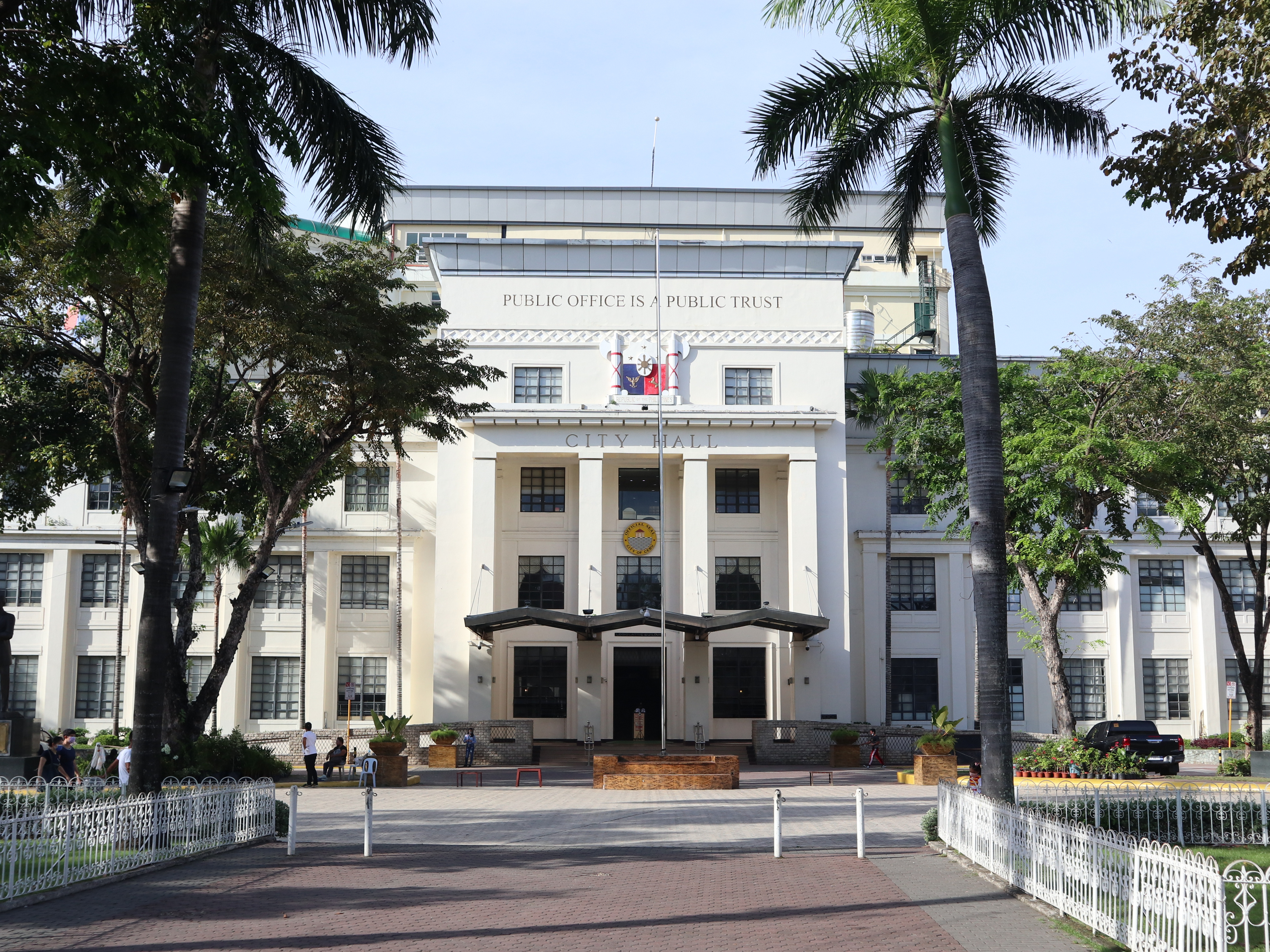
- Cebu City Hall in 2022
- Interactive map of the Cebu City Hall area

General information
- Status: Completed
- Type: City Government building
- Location: No. 1 Dr. Jose P. Rizal Street corner M. C. Briones Street & D. Jakosalem Street, Brgy. Sto. Niño, Cebu City, Philippines
- Coordinates: 10°17′34″N 123°54′05″E
- Completed: 1950
- Owner: City of Cebu
- Operator: City of Cebu

Technical details
- Floor count: 4 (Legislative Building); 9 (Executive Building)
- Lifts/elevators: 1 (Legislative Building); 2 (Executive Building)

Design and construction
- Developer: City of Cebu

The Cebu City Hall is the official seat of government of the City of Cebu, located in Barangay Santo Niño, Cebu City, Philippines. Composed of two buildings namely the Executive Building and the Legislative Building, it is where the Mayor of Cebu City holds office and houses the Cebu City Council. It also hosts several offices under the Cebu City Government.

In 2006, the city government spent ₱120 million to renovate its legislative building, where ₱15 million came from the Philippine Tourism Authority, and was officially inaugurated by President Gloria Macapagal Arroyo on July 24, 2008 along with the new Plaza Sugbo.

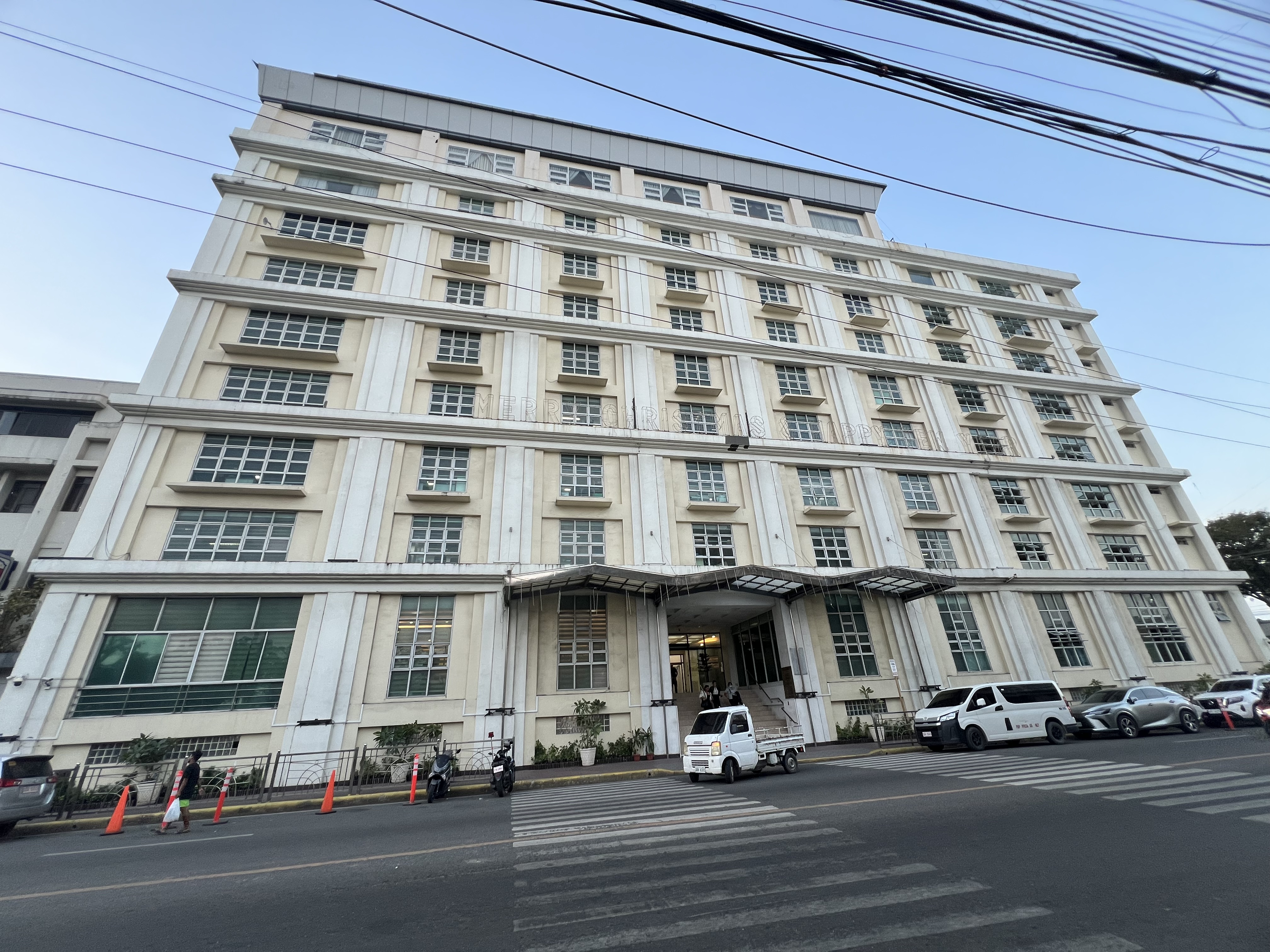
The City Hall from M.C. Briones Street

With the aim to decongest traffic in the city's downtown area, then mayor Michael Rama proposed in 2015 the transfer of the Cebu City Hall to the South Road Properties and convert the said building into a museum as it was close to significant historical landmarks of the city such as the Basilica del Santo Niño, Magellan's Cross, Cebu Metropolitan Cathedral, Fort San Pedro, Plaza Independencia, and Cathedral Museum of Cebu, among others. He was taking a page on constructing a government complex from Putrajaya which is Malaysia's seat of government.
