= List of places named after José Rizal =

This is a list of places in the Philippines named in honor of José Rizal, the Filipino nationalist, writer and revolutionary.

== Province ==
- Rizal

== Municipalities ==
- Rizal, Cagayan
- Rizal, Kalinga
- Rizal, Laguna
- Rizal, Nueva Ecija
- Rizal, Occidental Mindoro
- Rizal, Palawan
- Rizal, Zamboanga del Norte

== Education ==
- Jose Rizal Memorial State University, in Dapitan, Zamboanga del Norte
- José Rizal University, in Mandaluyong, Metro Manila
- Rizal High School, in Pasig, Metro Manila
- Rizal Institute - Canlubang, in Calamba, Laguna
- Rizal Library, in Quezon City, Metro Manila
- Rizal National Science High School, in Binangonan, Rizal
- Rizal Special Education Learning Center, in Davao City
- Rizal Technological University, in Mandaluyong, Metro Manila
- Sentro Rizal, in Manila
- University of Rizal System, in Rizal Province
- Jose Rizal Institute in Orion, Bataan

== Transportation ==
- J.P. Rizal Avenue, in Makati, Metro Manila
- Rizal Avenue, in Metro Manila
- Rizal Avenue, in Olongapo
- Rizal Avenue (disambiguation)
- Rizal Avenue Extension, in Malabon, Metro Manila
- Dr. Jose P. Rizal Street, in Cebu City, Cebu
- Rizal Boulevard, in Dumaguete, Negros Oriental
- Rizal Boulevard, in Santa Rosa, Laguna
- Rizal Drive, in Bonifacio Global City, Taguig, Metro Manila
- Rizal Street, in various towns and cities of the Philippines
- J.P. Rizal Street, in Tagaytay, Cavite
- J.P. Rizal Street, in various towns and cities of the Philippines

== Others ==
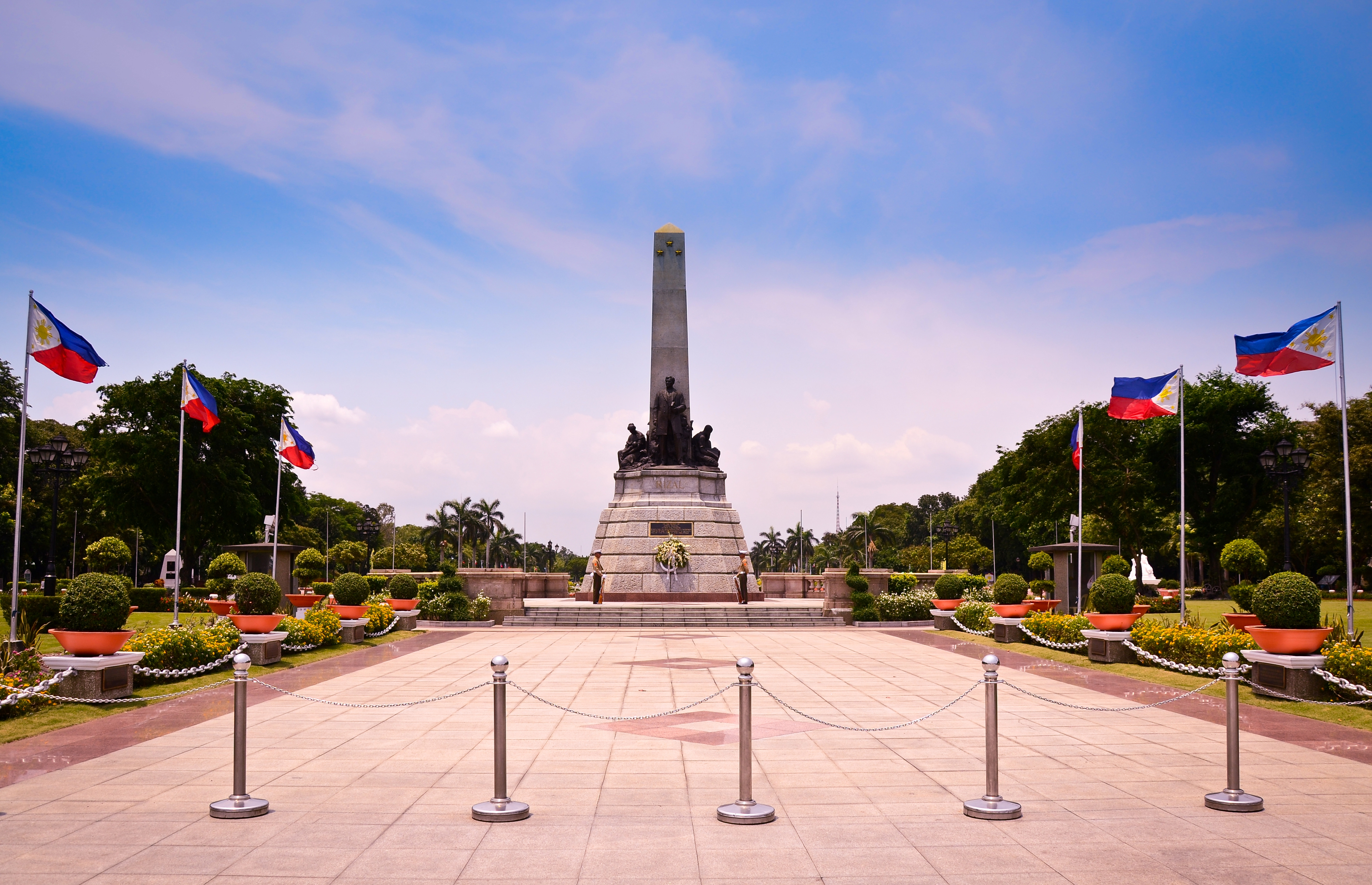
Rizal Park (Manila, Philippines)

- Jose Rizal Farm, in Katipunan, Zamboanga del Norte
- José Rizal Memorial Protected Landscape, in Dapitan, Zamboanga del Norte
- Rizal Memorial Baseball Stadium, in Malate, Manila
- Rizal Memorial Coliseum, in Malate, Manila
- Rizal Memorial Sports Complex, in Malate, Manila
- Rizal Memorial Stadium, in Malate, Manila
- Rizal Park, in Ermita, Manila
- Rizal Shrine, in Intramuros, Manila

== Outside the Philippines ==
Places named after José Rizal outside the Philippines
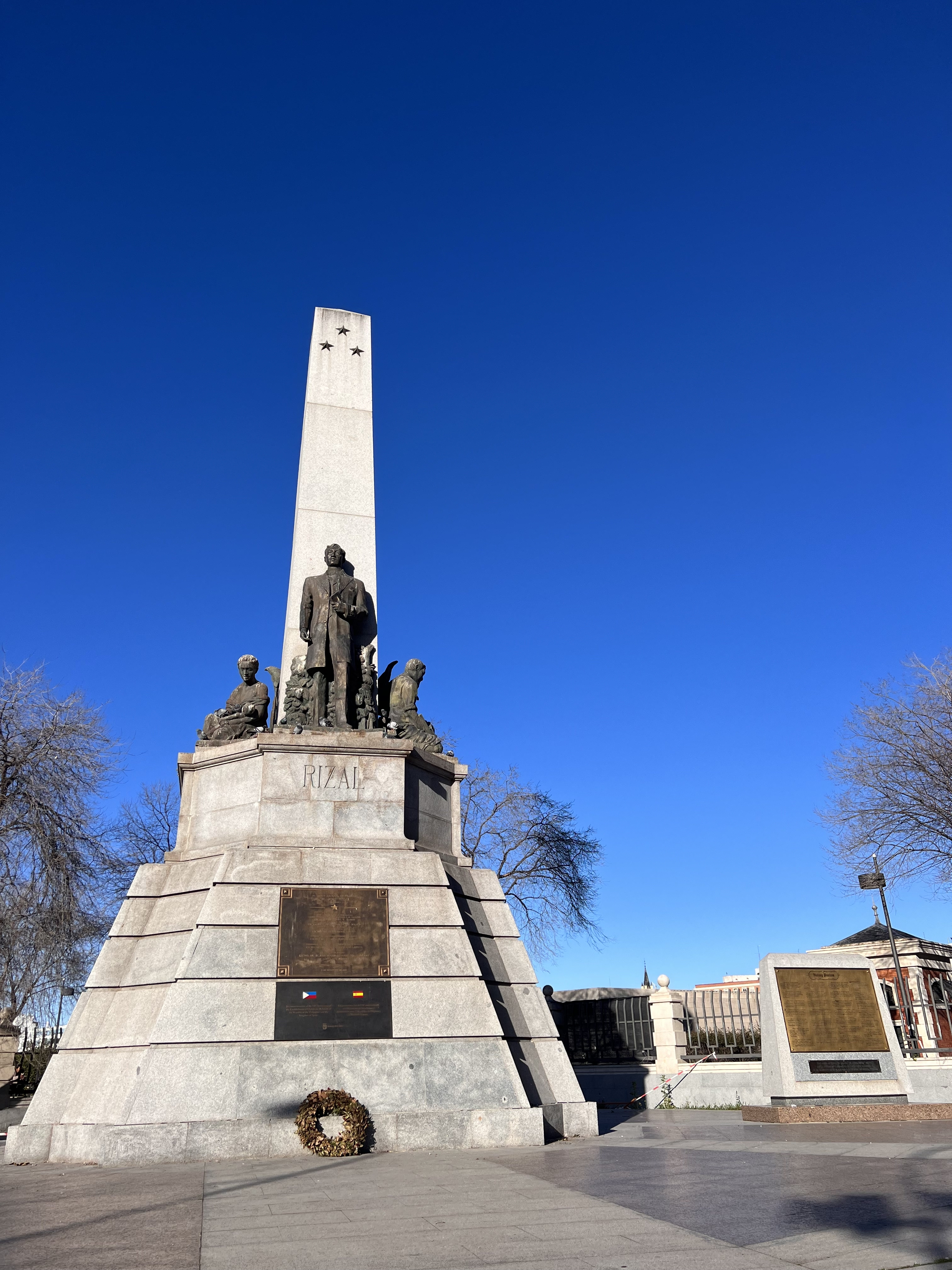
Monumento a Rizal (Avenida de Filipinas, Madrid, Spain)

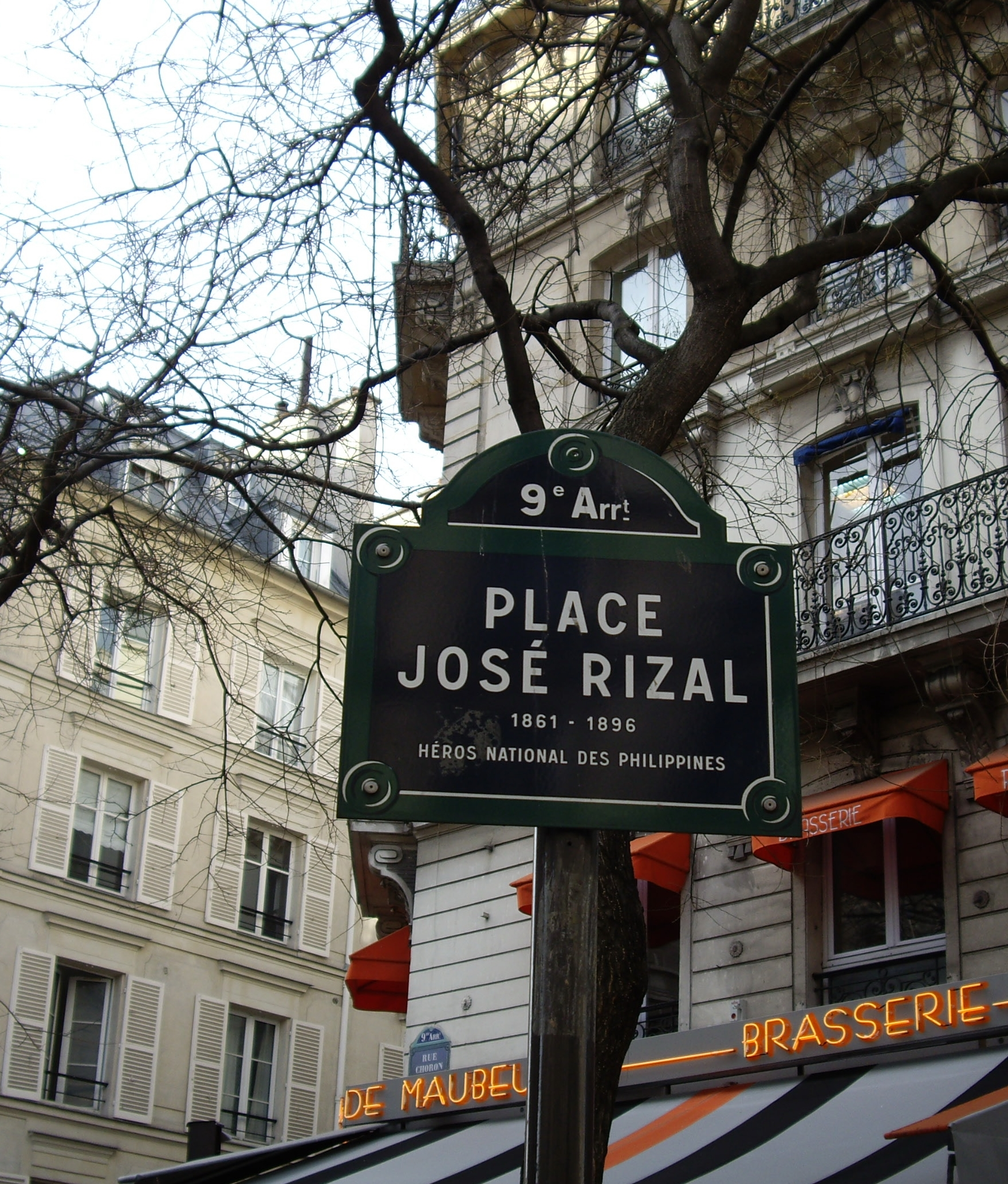
Place José-Rizal (Paris, France)

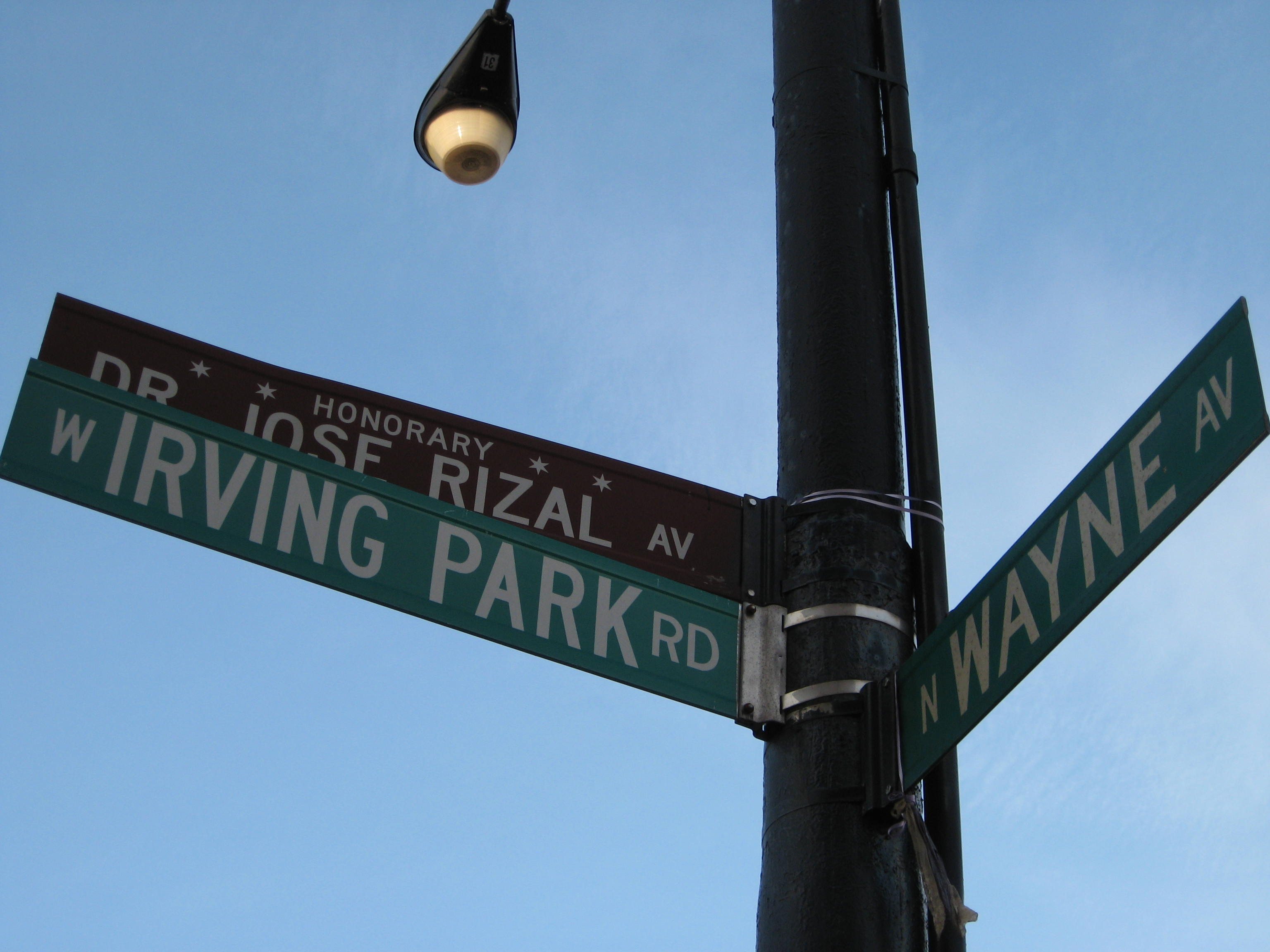
Street sign in Chicago (Dr. Jose Rizal Avenue)
- Rizal Park, in Sydney, Australia
- Dr. José Rizal Park and Monument at 111 Sewa Crescent in Winnipeg, Manitoba, Canada
- Dr. José Rizal Monument, a life-size sculpture on a stone platform at Waterford Green Common in Winnipeg, Manitoba, Canada
- Dr. Jose Rizal Way, a street in Winnipeg, Manitoba, Canada
- Dr. Jose Rizal Monument, in Markham, Ontario, Canada
- Rizal Park, in Jinjiang, China
- Place José-Rizal, a public square in Paris, France
- José-Rizal-Straße, a street in Wilhemsfeld, Germany
- Dr. Jose P. Rizal Marg, a street in New Delhi, India
- Jalan Jose Rizal, a street in Medan, Indonesia
- Jose Rizal Monument in Bitung, Indonesia
- Parque José Rizal, in Lima, Peru
- José Rizal Monument, in Madrid, Spain
- Dr. Rizal Suite 305, a hotel suite in the Grand Oriental Hotel in Colombo, Sri Lanka. Formerly known as just Room 305, the suite was occupied by Rizal himself during his stay in the island then known as Ceylon.
- Dr. Jose Rizal Avenue, a street in Chicago, Illinois, USA
- Jose Rizal Bridge, in Seattle, Washington, USA
- Rizal Park, in Seattle, Washington, USA
- Dr. José P. Rizal Way, in Woodside, Queens, New York, USA

== See also ==
- Species named after José Rizal
