= Rizal Monument (Madrid) =

Monument in Madrid, Spain

- Monumento a José Rizal; Bantayog ni José Rizal
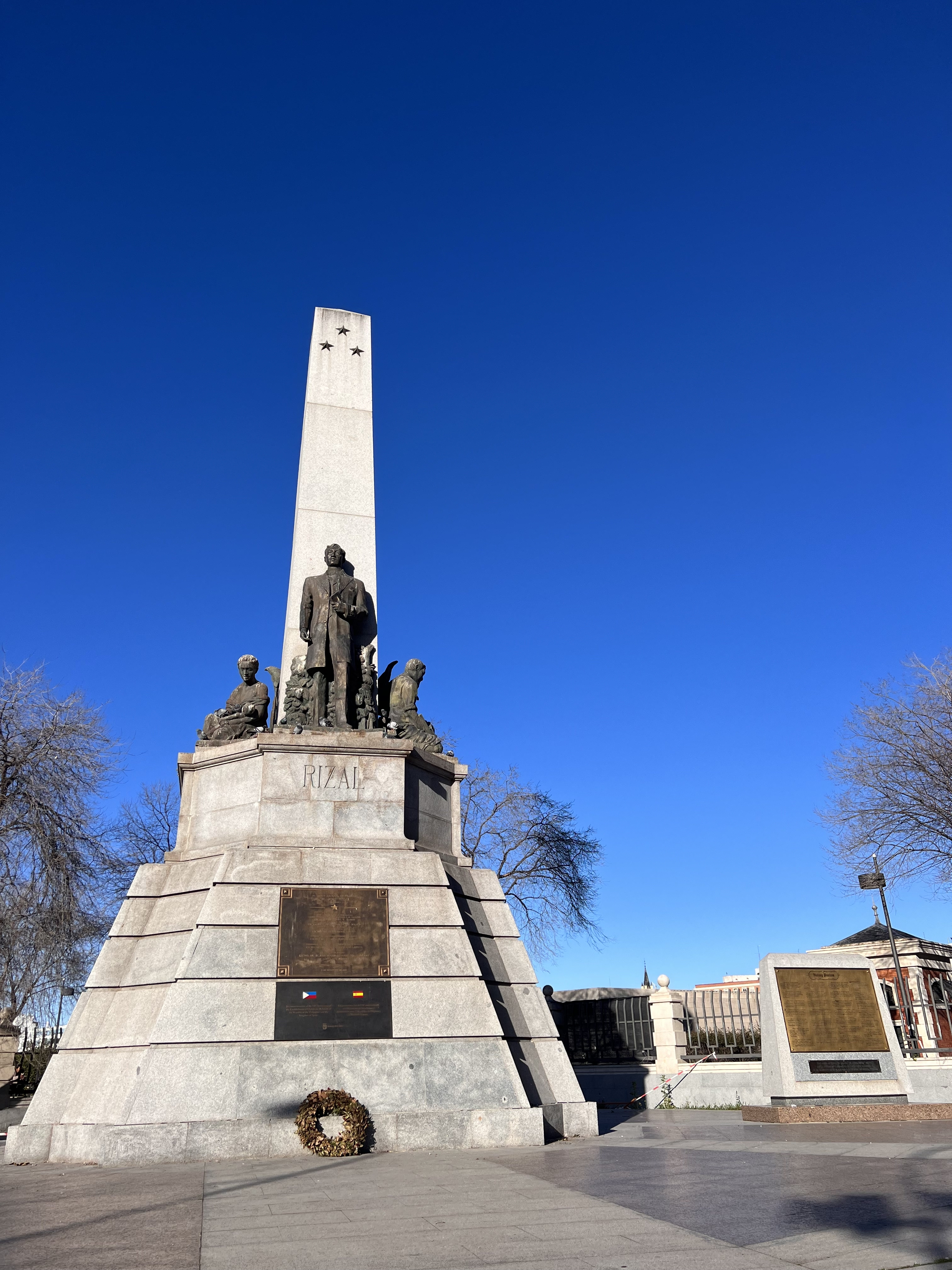
- The monument in 2023
- Interactive map of Rizal Monument
- Location: Avenida de Filipinas, Chamberí, Madrid
- Coordinates: 40°26′28.2″N 3°42′28.3″W
- Designer: Richard Kissling; Florante "Boy" Caedo
- Type: Cenotaph
- Material: Granite
- Height: 15 m (49 ft)
- Opening date: December 5, 1996
- Dedicated to: José Rizal, a Filipino nationalist

The Rizal Monument is a memorial in Madrid, Spain built to commemorate José Rizal, an executed Filipino nationalist regarded as a national hero of the Philippines. Located at a corner of the Parque de Santander along the Avenida de Filipinas in the district of Chamberí, the monument is a near-exact replica of Motto Stella, erected in Rizal's memory near his execution site at the modern-day Rizal Park in Manila.

== History ==
The Rizal Monument was built in 1996. Unlike other countries which erected their own Rizal monuments in the 1960s, during the centennial of his birth, Spain at the time refused to consider building one owing to prevailing negative sentiment against Rizal in the country.

Changing attitudes in Spain towards Rizal's legacy eventually led to the monument being built, nearly a century after he was executed by Spanish authorities, an event that led to the Philippine Revolution. The monument was ultimately inaugurated on December 5, 1996, part of a number of celebrations leading to the Philippine Centennial nearly two years later. The inauguration was attended by President Fidel V. Ramos, former Vice President Salvador Laurel who served as president of the National Centennial Commission, Spanish Minister of Foreign Affairs Abel Matutes, and Alberto Ruiz-Gallardón, President of the Community of Madrid.

On November 18, 2010, Brother Jaazael Jakosalem, a visiting Augustinian Recollect priest and property administrator of the University of Negros Occidental – Recoletos in Bacolod, reported to Bacolod-based newspaper, 'The Visayan Daily Star', that the monument had been defaced with red anti-Mason graffiti, hinting at Rizal's Masonic relationship. The Philippine Embassy in Madrid immediately requested that the Madrid city government clean up the monument, which they did the next day.

== Design and layout ==
The Rizal Monument is located on a 70 m^{2} (750 sq ft) lot, donated by the Madrid city government, at the corner of the Parque de Santander. While the monument is based on the original design of the Manila monument by Swiss sculptor Richard Kissling, the monument's bronze statues were created by Filipino sculptor Florante "Boy" Caedo, with landscaping work done by Spanish architect Manuel Rivero Vázquez, who headed the Madrid city government's urban design office. The monument weighs around 200 tons.

Although said by some to be an exact replica, most notably by President Gloria Macapagal Arroyo, a few slight differences distinguish the Madrid monument from the original. With a height of 15 m (49 ft), the monument is slightly taller than the 12.7 m (42 ft) of the original. Also, the bronze statue of Rizal, standing four m (13 ft) tall, is looking straight ahead as opposed to the original which is looking sideways. The front of the pedestal, meanwhile, contains two plaques: one commemorating its inauguration in 1996, and another, unveiled on October 28, 2022, celebrating 75 years of Philippines–Spain relations.

To the sides of the monument are smaller brass markers engraved with Rizal's final work, "Mi último adiós", with the Spanish original on the left and on the right, a Tagalog translation. The Tagalog translation was written by José Gatmaytan which is also displayed near the original monument in Manila.

Surrounding the monument are upscale apartment buildings with a few commercial establishments, as well as green space formed by the Parque de Santander and a new park being redeveloped on the site of the Tercer Depósito de Canal de Isabel II, which previously hosted a golf range. An ice cream stand also once stood directly opposite the monument. The Estadio de Vallehermoso, meanwhile, stands across from the monument on the other side of the Calle de Santander.

== Cultural significance ==
The Rizal Monument in Madrid holds significant sentimental value for Filipinos, and is said to be one of the most prominent landmarks for Filipinos visiting the city. The Philippine Embassy in Madrid often points people to the monument as one of the best Rizal-themed tourist sites, and it also organizes annual commemorations celebrating Rizal's birth and death at the site. Presidents Arroyo and Benigno Aquino III have also laid flowers at the monument during their respective state visits to Spain. Filipinos in Spain have also organized rallies in front of the monument: in 2019, members of the local community organized a rally at the monument denouncing the Communist Party of the Philippines.

Other prominent Filipinos in Spain have been seen at the monument. At its inauguration in 1996, socialite Isabel Preysler was in attendance, and her arrival drew all the photographers sent to cover the event to her, leading an organizer to point out that the monument they were sent to take pictures of was actually opposite where she was standing.

== See also ==
- List of places named after José Rizal
