= Rizal Monument =

Monument in Manila, Philippines

- Bantayog ni José Rizal; Monumento a José Rizal
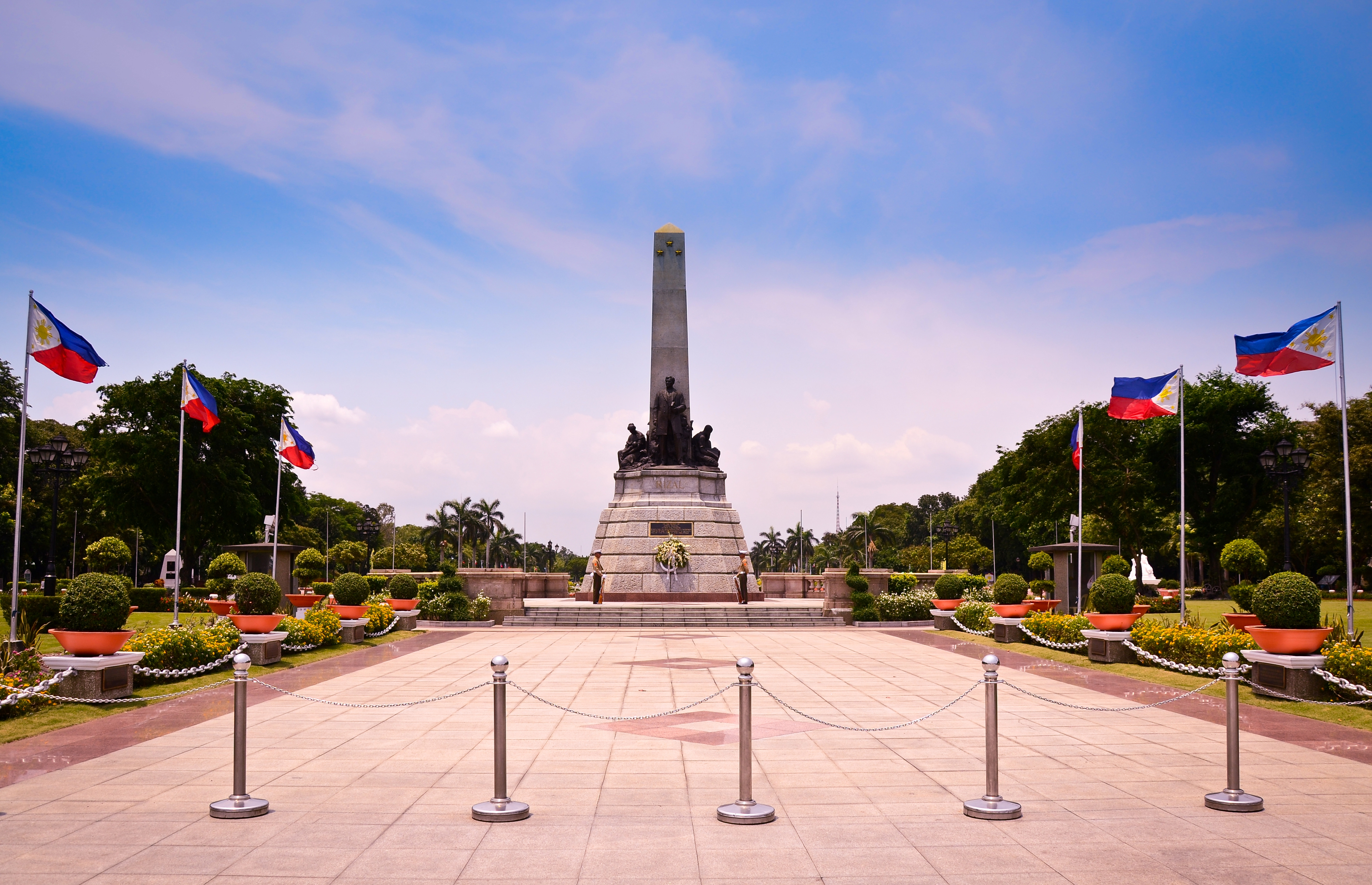
- The monument in 2012
- Interactive map of Rizal Monument
- Location: Rizal Park, Ermita, Manila
- Coordinates: 14.581669°N 120.976694°E
- Designer: Richard Kissling
- Type: Mausoleum
- Material: Granite
- Height: 12.7 meters (42 ft)
- Beginning date: 1908; 118 years ago
- Completion date: 1913; 113 years ago
- Opening date: December 30, 1913; 112 years ago
- Dedicated to: The memory of José Rizal, patriot and martyr

National Historical Landmarks
- Official name: José Rizal National Monument
- Type: Structure, monument
- Designated: April 15, 2013; 13 years ago
- Legal basis: No. 05, s. 2013
- Marker date: 2013; 13 years ago

The Rizal Monument (Filipino: Bantayog ni José Rizal; originally known as Motto Stella, Latin for "guiding star") is a memorial in Rizal Park, Manila, Philippines, built to commemorate the executed Filipino nationalist José Rizal. The monument consists of a standing bronze sculpture of Rizal before an obelisk, set on a stone base in which his remains are interred. The statue depicts Rizal holding copies of his two novels, Noli Me Tángere and El filibusterismo. A plaque on the front of the pedestal reads: "To the memory of José Rizal, patriot and martyr, executed on Bagumbayan Field December 30, 1896. This monument is dedicated by the people of the Philippine Islands."

The monument is continuously guarded by the Philippine Marine Corps' Marine Security and Escort Group, and the changing of the guard has become a daily ceremony. About 100 m (330 ft) north-northwest of the monument is the exact location where Rizal was executed, marked by life-size dioramas depicting his final moments. The monument is the most recognizable landmark in Luneta and is regarded as one of the country's most important national monuments.

A near-exact replica of the monument stands in Madrid, Spain, at the junction of Avenida de las Islas Filipinas and Calle Santander.

== Symbolism ==
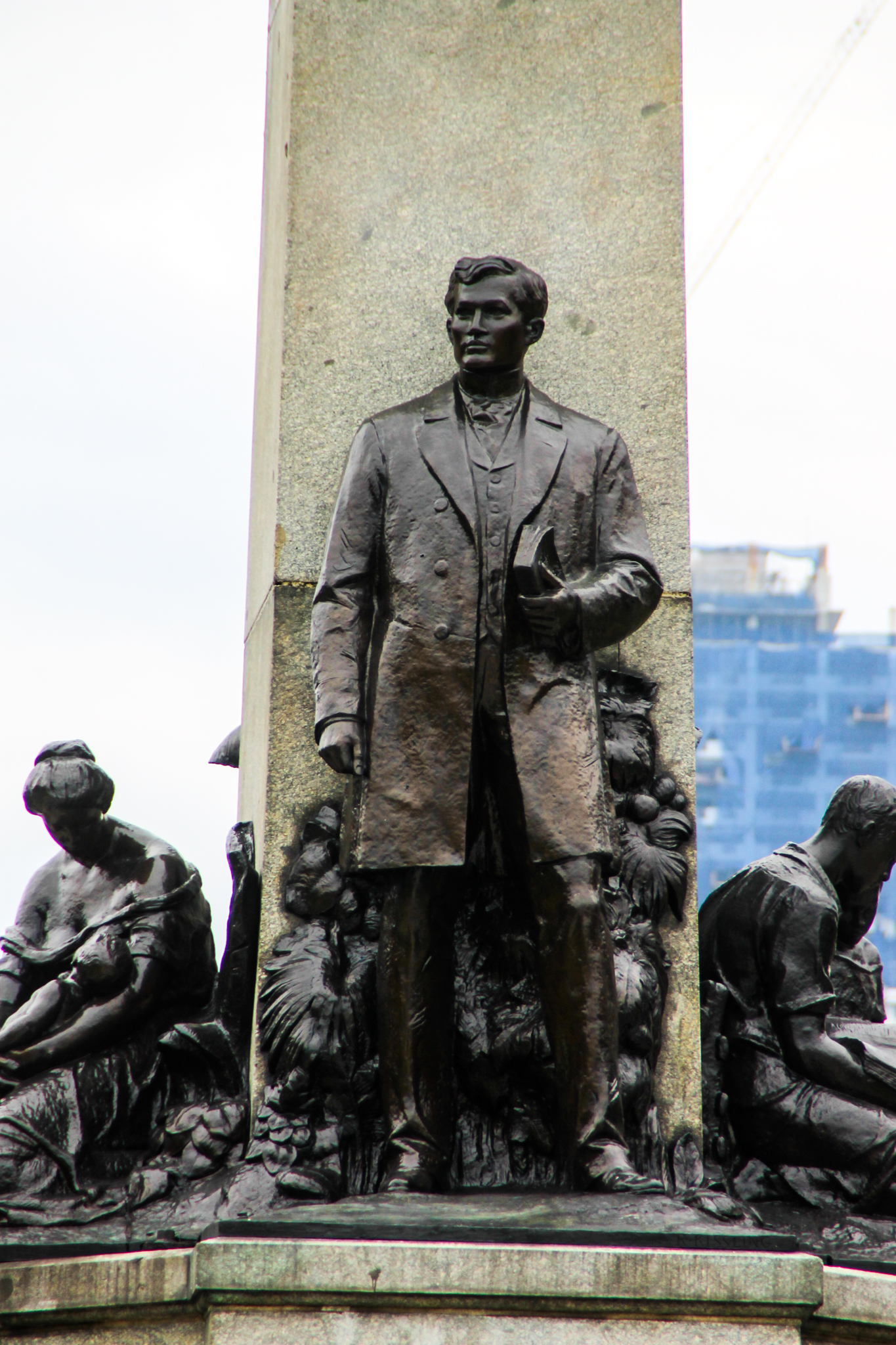
Detail of José Rizal's statue on the monument

There is also an official explanation of the meaning of the monument's details. The monument depicts Rizal in an overcoat holding a book, that has the title "NOLI ME TÁNGERE" inscribed. This is contrary to the usual representation of the book as a symbol of both the inscribed novel and its sequel El Filibusterismo, as well as Rizal's annotation of Antonio de Morga's Sucesos de las Islas Filipinas. The obelisk is usually taken to mean Rizal's Masonic background while the three stars are said to stand for Luzon, the Visayas and Mindanao. The figures at the back of the monument, such as leaves and a pot, are said to symbolize the country's natural resources. The consensus is that the figures beside Rizal—a mother rearing her child and two young boys reading—signify family and education.

== History ==
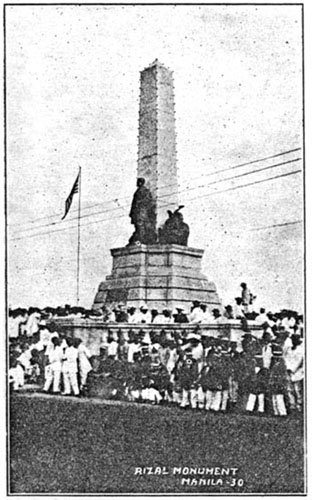
The monument, circa 1930

The Rizal Monument was planned and constructed during the American colonial period of the Philippines in the early 20th century.

=== Act No. 243 ===
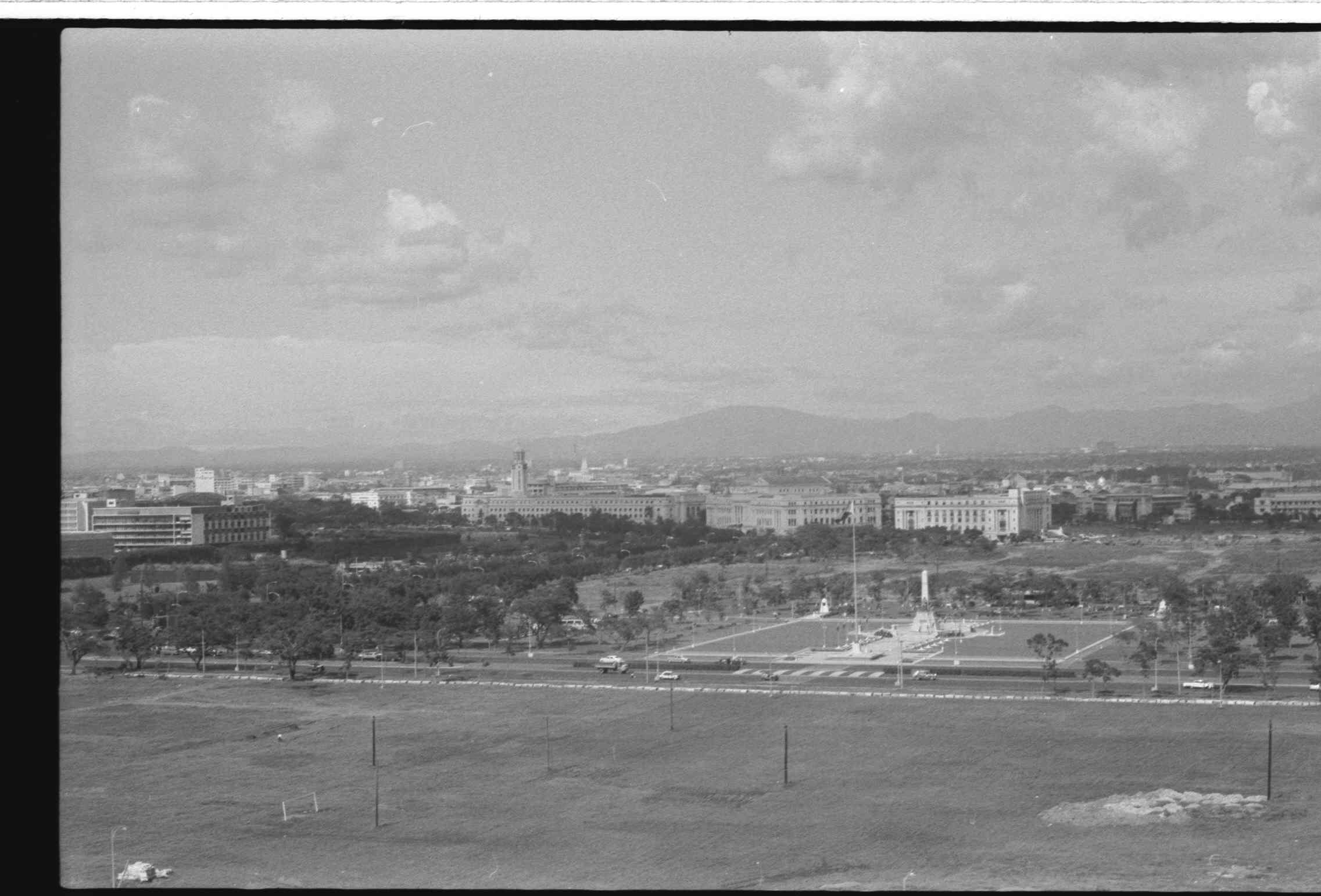
Aerial view of the monument, circa 1964

On September 28, 1901, the United States Philippine Commission approved Act No. 243, that granted the right to use public land upon the Luneta in the city of Manila, where the monument was erected to commemorate the memory of José Rizal, Philippine patriot, writer, and poet. The act stated that the monument would not only bear a statue of the hero, but would also house his remains. The act also created a committee on the Rizal monument that consisted of Pascual Poblete, Paciano Rizal (José's brother), Juan Tuason, Teodoro R. Yangco, Mariano Limjap, Máximo Paterno, Ramón Genato, Tomás G. del Rosario, and Ariston Bautista. The members were tasked, among others, with raising funds through popular subscriptions.

=== Design competition ===
The committee held an international design competition between 1905–1907 and invited sculptors from Europe and the United States to submit entries with material preference produced in the archipelago. The estimated cost of the monument was ₱100,000. The insular government donated ₱30,000 for the fund. By January 1905, that goal had been oversubscribed. When the campaign closed in August 1912, the amount collected had reached ₱135,195.61.

=== Winner announced ===
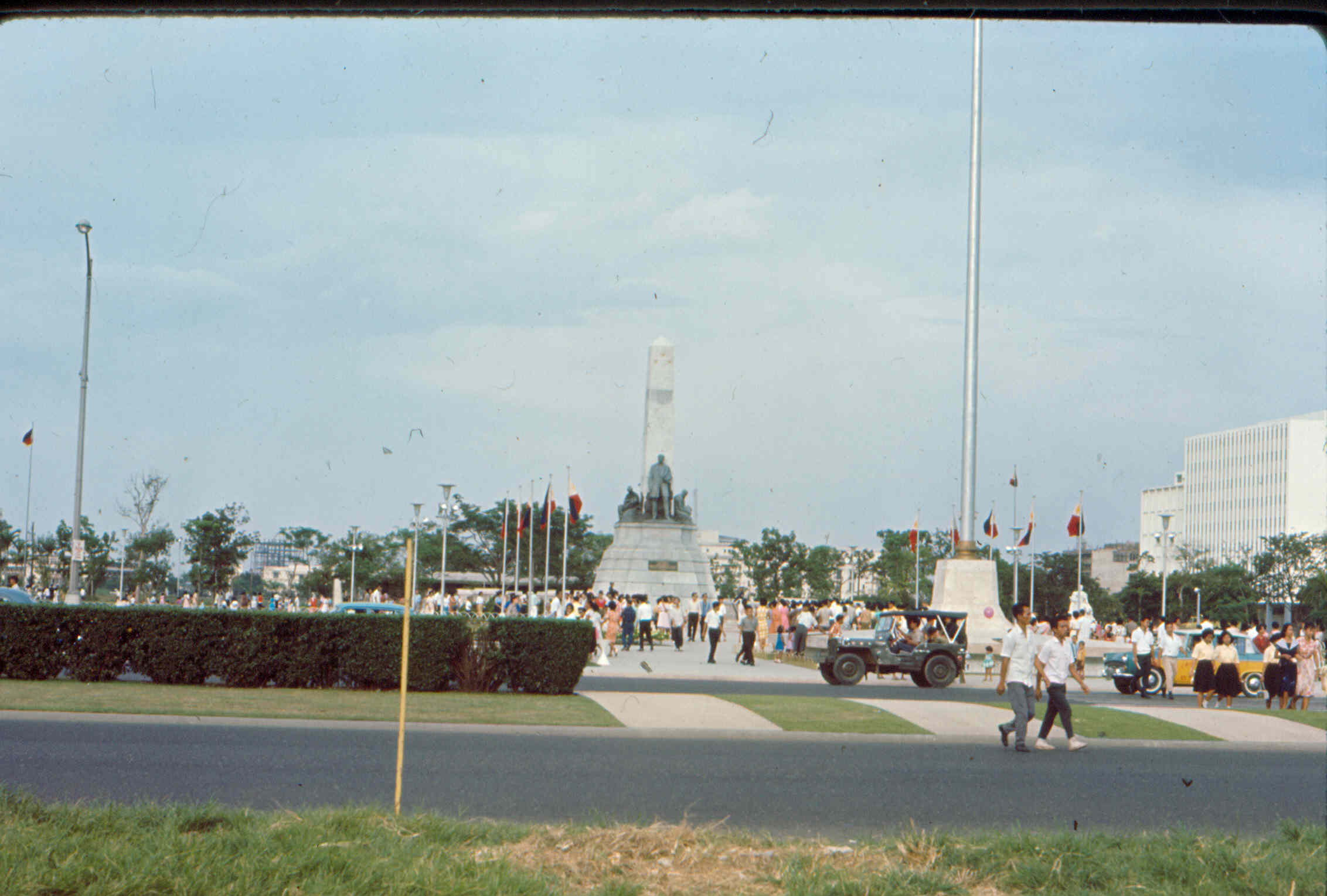
Rizal Monument, circa 1964

On January 8, 1908, the judging committee composed of then Governor-General James F. Smith, John T. MacLeod, and Máximo M. Paterno, officially announced its decision through the press. The first-prize winner was Carlo Nicoli of Carrara, Italy for his scaled plaster model titled "Al Mártir de Bagumbayan" (To the Martyr of Bagumbayan) besting 40 other accepted entries. Nicoli won the ₱5,000.00 first prize for his design depicting a monument rising 18 meters (59 ft) high with a base of 12 meters (39 ft). The base was to be rendered in two shades of gray marble while the pedestal, in two shades of white marble. Among his other plans were the use of marble from Italy and the incorporation of more elaborate figurative elements.

=== Controversies ===
The contract was awarded to second-placer Swiss sculptor named Richard Kissling for his "Motto Stella" (Guiding Star). Many accounts explained why the contract landed to Kissling, one is Nicoli's inability to post the required performance bond of ₱20,000 for the duration of the monument's construction. Some sources say that Nicoli failed to show up at the designated date for the signing of the job contract. Another narrative declared Kissling's quotation was lower than that of Nicoli. A complaint was reportedly filed by Nicoli through the courts of justice.

Some of the local press lambasted Kissling's model. It was satirized in a cartoon and labeled vulgar y tosco, meaning "lousy". The constituents of the Jury of Awards – none of whom were artists, architects nor engineers – were also questioned. There were plans for the famous Filipino painter Félix Resurrección Hidalgo to inspect and modify the design. However, the latter was ultimately left "as it is" since the bronze of the statues had already been cast in Switzerland.

=== Dedication ===
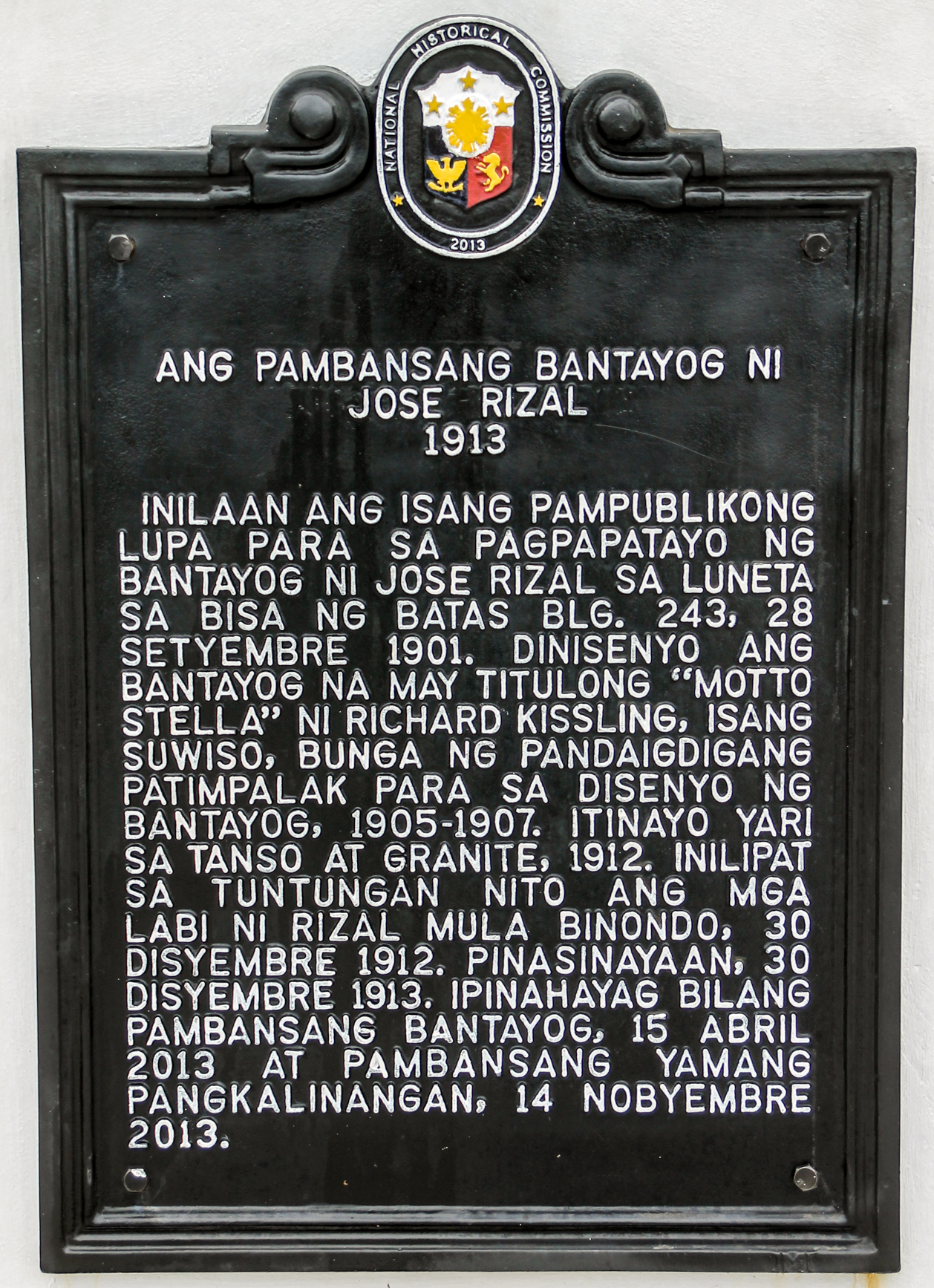
Detail of the National Historical Commission of the Philippines (NHCP) marker near the monument

More than twelve years after the Philippine Commissions approval of the Act, the shrine was finally unveiled on December 30, 1913 during Rizal's 17th death anniversary. The remains of Rizal interred in the monument which consisted of bones because after his execution, he was secretly buried without a coffin at Paco Cemetery. There was an account of how his sister Narcisa ultimately discovered the burial site and how she bribed the caretaker to mark the site with RPJ—Rizal's initials in reverse. His poem, now popularly known as "Mi Último Adiós" ("My Last Farewell") is inscribed on the memorial plaque.

=== World War II ===
During World War II in 1943, the Japanese government issued "invasion money" to occupied territories in the Pacific area of operations, one of which was the Philippines. Out of three series, the second was issued in 1, 5, 10, and 100 pesos only. All have the Rizal Monument vignette on the banknote.

=== Steel pylon ===
In Rizal's birth centenary year of 1961, a stainless steel pylon was superimposed over the granite obelisk, increasing the structure's height from 12.7 meters (42 ft) to 30.5 meters (100 ft). The remodeling undertaken by the Jose Rizal National Centennial Commission (JRNCC) was widely criticized. Many found the gleaming modern steel shaft incompatible with the somber granite base. Moreover, the latter seemed to dwarf the much smaller Rizal figure. Others simply disliked the idea of tampering with a popular and traditional image.

The designer of the remodeling was Juan Nakpil, who later became the country's first National Artist for Architecture. He quoted former Education Secretary and JRNCC chair Manuel Lim as envisioning the pylon as a convenient reference point for incoming boats, and for people lost around the city.

The ₱145,000 shaft was removed two years later under the request of Education Secretary Alejandro Roces and Director of Public Libraries Carlos Quirino. It was dismantled during Holy Week, reportedly to prevent any court injunction from restraining them as government offices were closed during holidays. The pylon was relocated to the median of Roxas Boulevard at the Pasay–Parañaque boundary but, since 1995, it had disappeared and its fate remains unknown.

== Management ==
Rizal Monument, as well as Rizal Park, is administered by the National Parks Development Committee, an attached agency of the Department of Tourism.

== Gallery ==
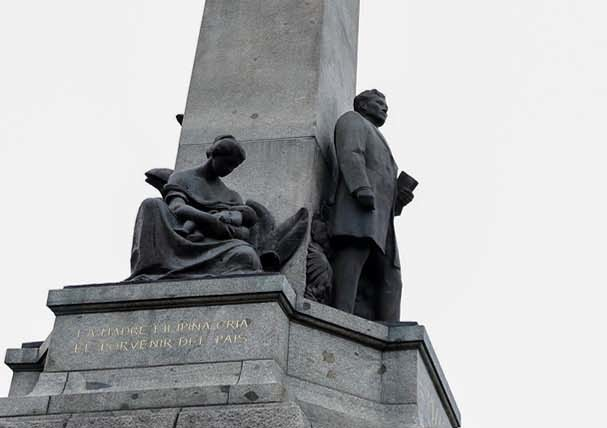
Left detail

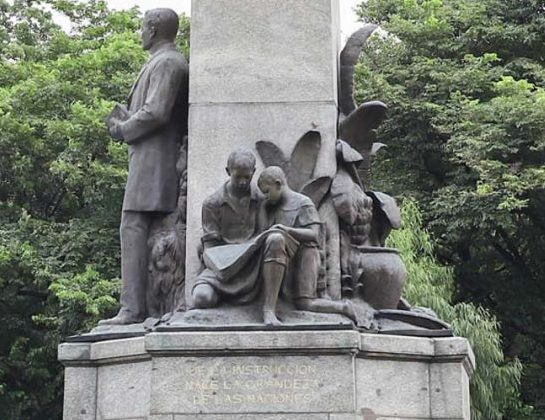
Right detail

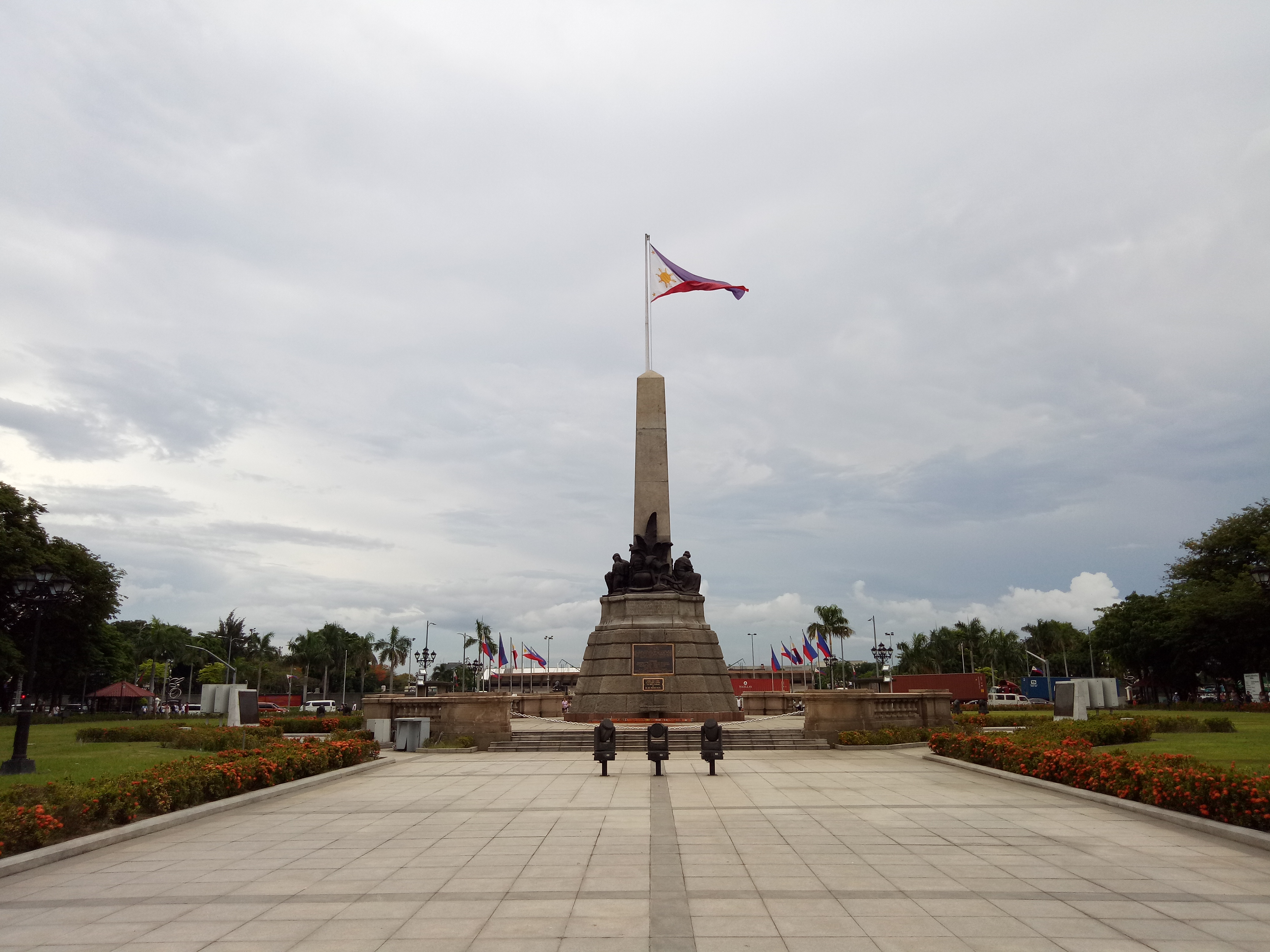
Back view

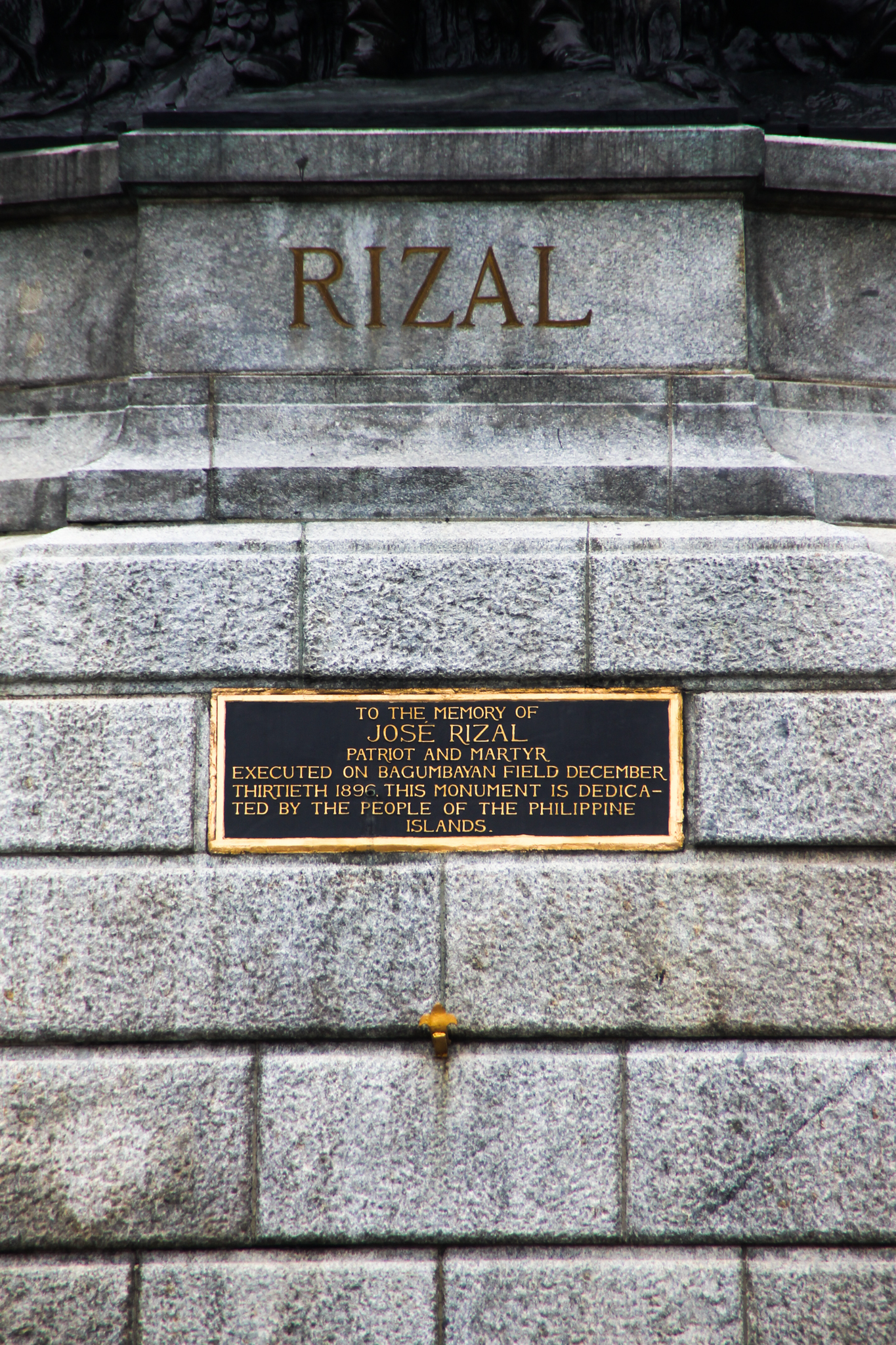
Front marker

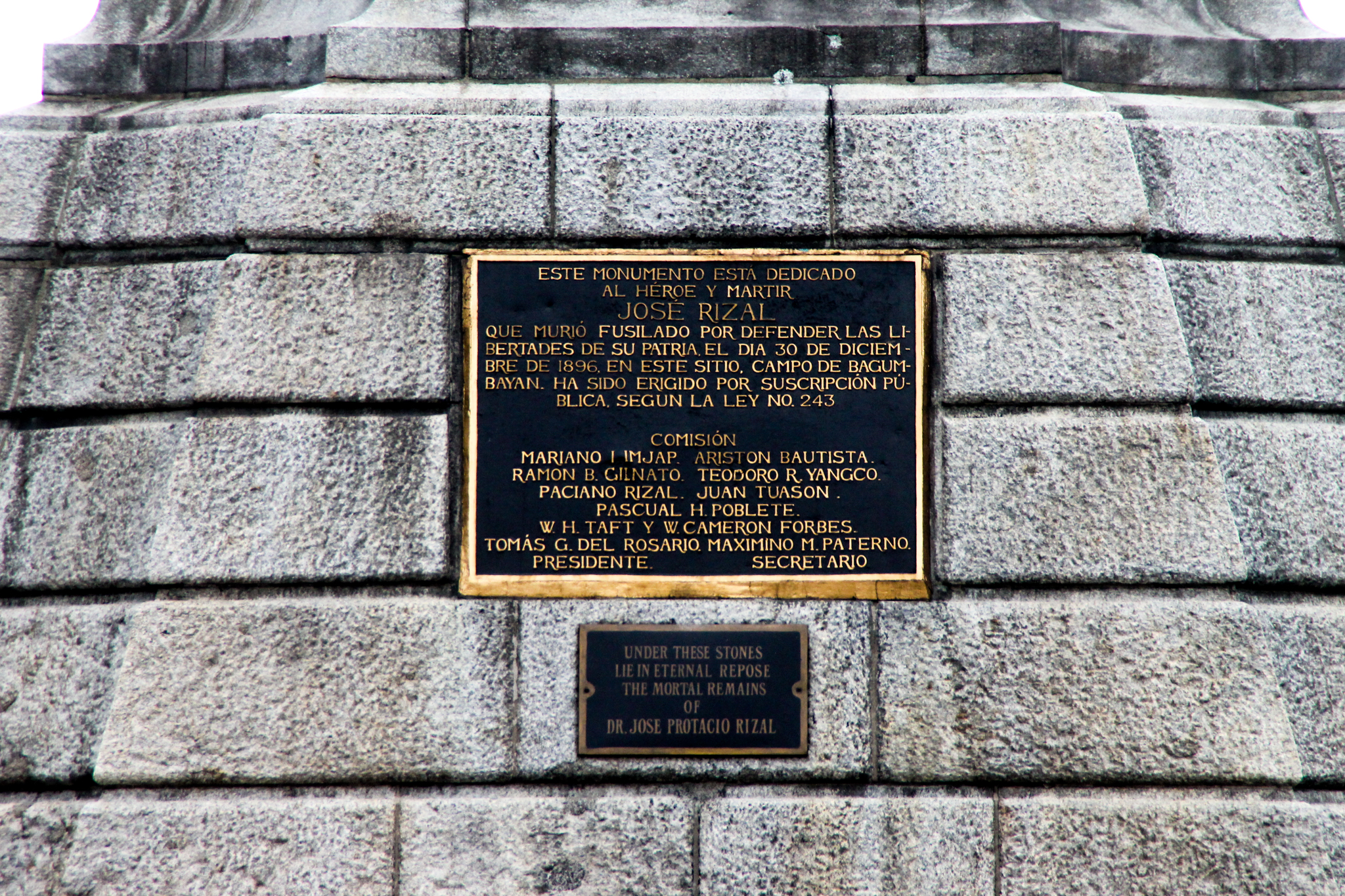
Rear marker

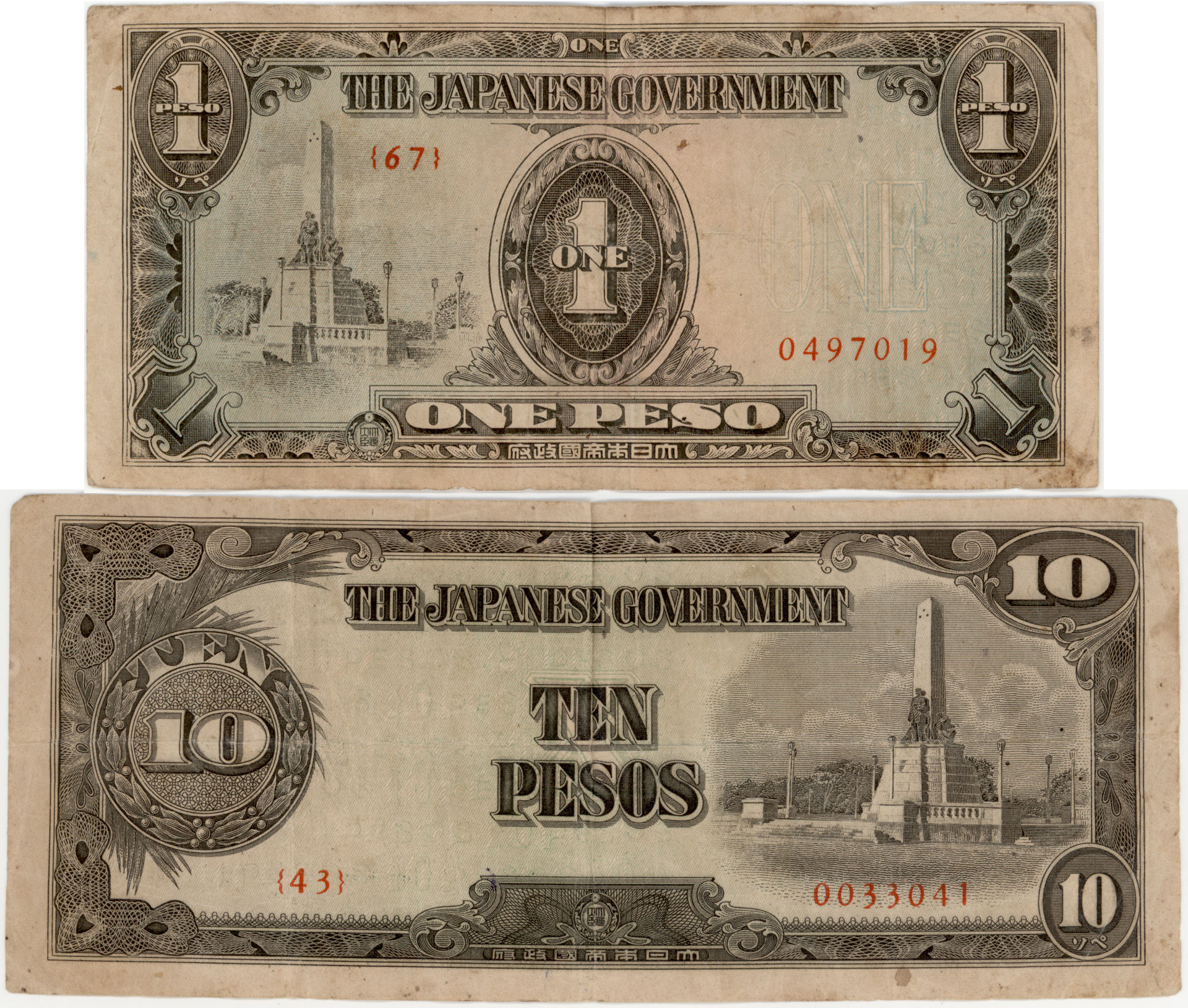
WWII Philippine banknote with Rizal Monument

== See also ==
- Rizal Monument (Daet)
