= Plaza Independencia (Cebu City) =

Public park in Cebu City, Philippines

- Public square
- Aerial view, showing the Plaza Independencia with the Cebu Port Pier 1 (back) and the former Malacañang Sa Sugbo/Aduana Building (right)
- Features: Fort San Pedro; Miguel López de Legazpi Monument; Antonio Pigafetta Monument; Ramon Magsaysay Monument; Cebu Veterans Memorial
- Location: Cebu City, Philippines
- Interactive map of Plaza Independencia
- Coordinates: 10°17′34.5″N 123°54′20.0″E

The Plaza Independencia ("Independence Plaza") is a Spanish colonial era plaza in Cebu City.

== Names ==
Various names have been used to refer to the Plaza Independencia throughout its history. In the 17th century, it was known as the Plaza de Armas and later the Plaza Mayor. In the later part of the Spanish colonial era in the Philippines, the civic space was referred to as the Plaza de María Cristina, in honor of Queen Maria Christina of the Two Sicilies. Sometime during the American colonial period of the first half of the 20th century, the square was known as the Plaza Libertad. The plaza's current name was adopted sometime prior to the start of World War II.

== Features ==
The Plaza Independencia grounds features a historic triangular fortification known as the Fort San Pedro. It also has a monument which was built in honor of Spanish navigator Miguel López de Legazpi, who also became the first Governor-General of the Philippines, and a fountain. It also has other monuments dedicated to other figures such as chronicler Antonio Pigafetta, President Ramon Magsaysay and to war veterans. An underground tunnel, built from 2009 to 2011, connects mainland Cebu City to the South Road Properties.

The Pigafetta monument was restored in 2021, in line with the 2021 Quincentennial Commemorations in the Philippines.

== Heritage designation ==
The Plaza Independencia is identified as a heritage site by the National Historical Institute. The Cebu City Council also has passed an ordinance in 2020 which protects heritage and cultural sites in the city including the plaza.

== Gallery ==
Andrés Bonifacio statue

Filipino-Japanese Memorial

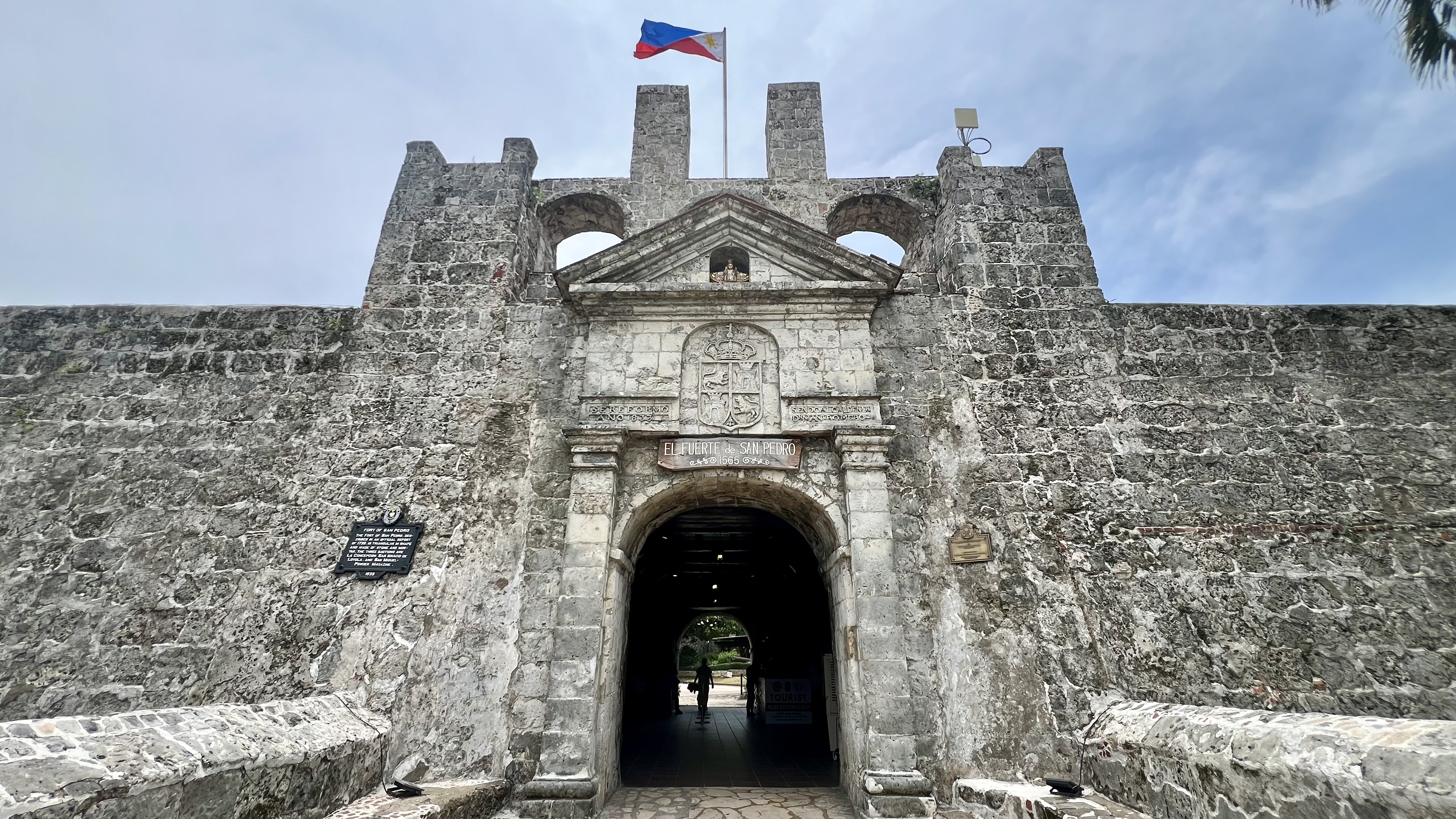
Fort San Pedro

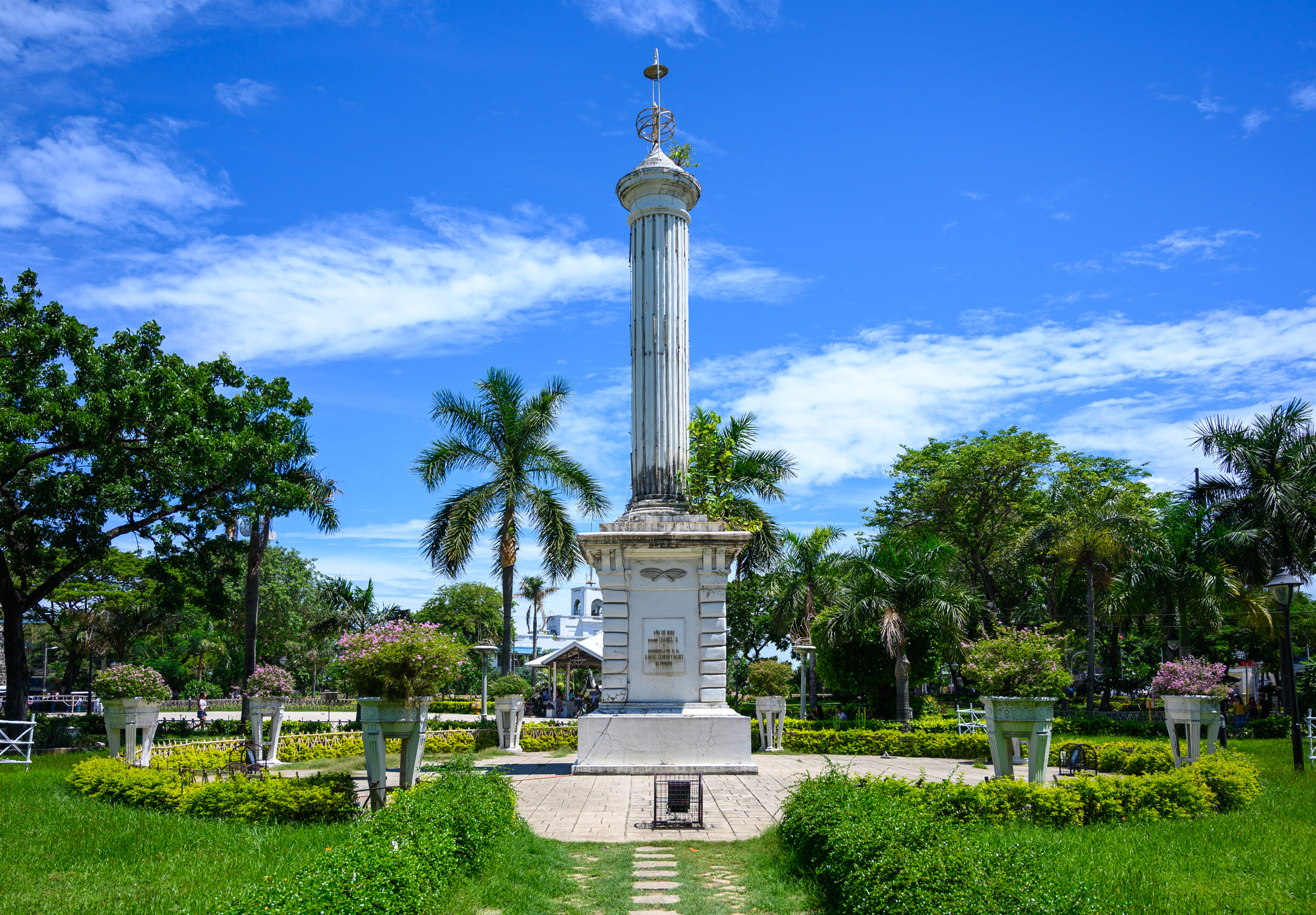
Miguel López de Legazpi Monument

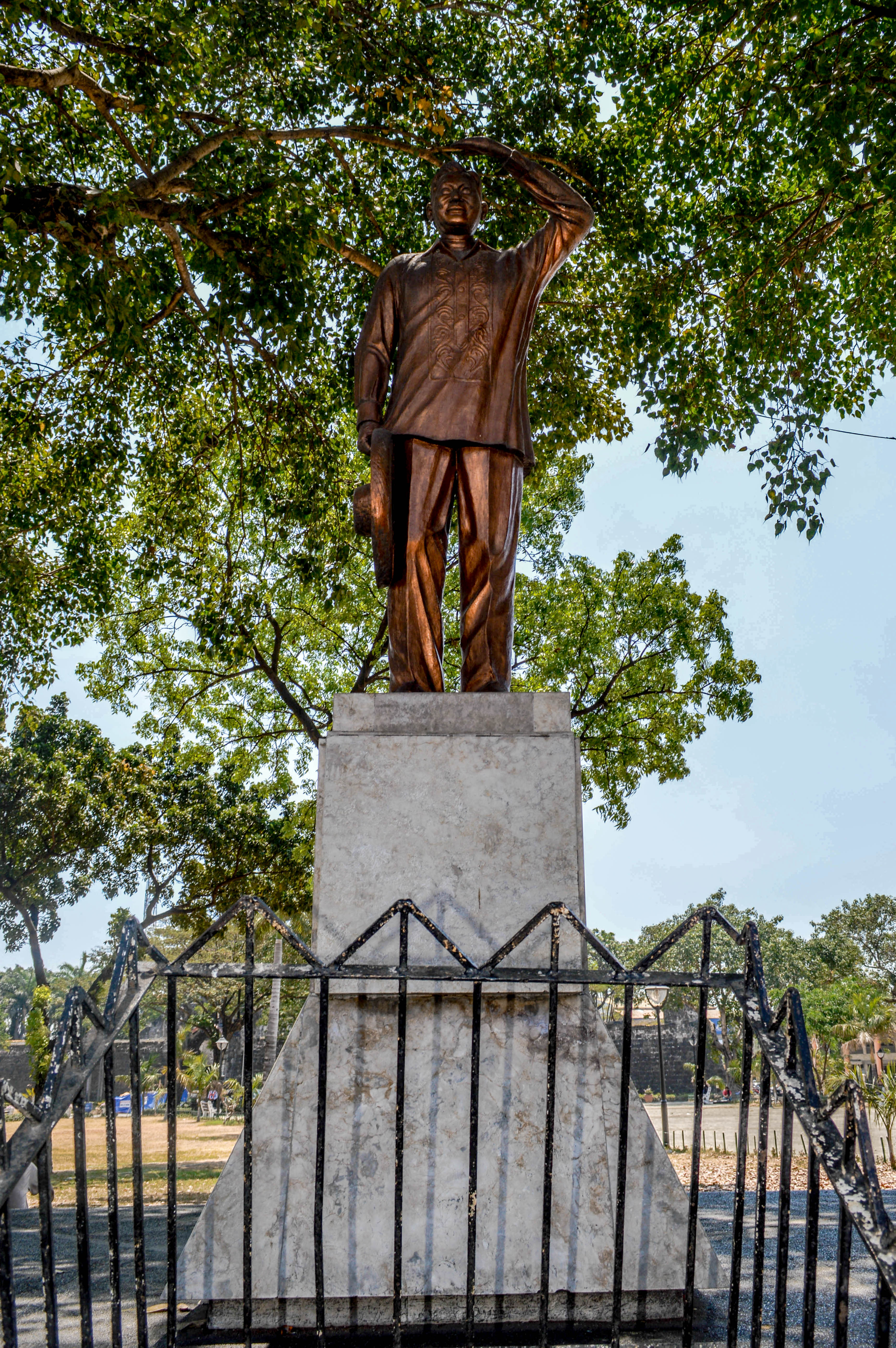
Ramon Magsaysay Monument

Martial Law memorial

Order of Augustinian Recollects monument

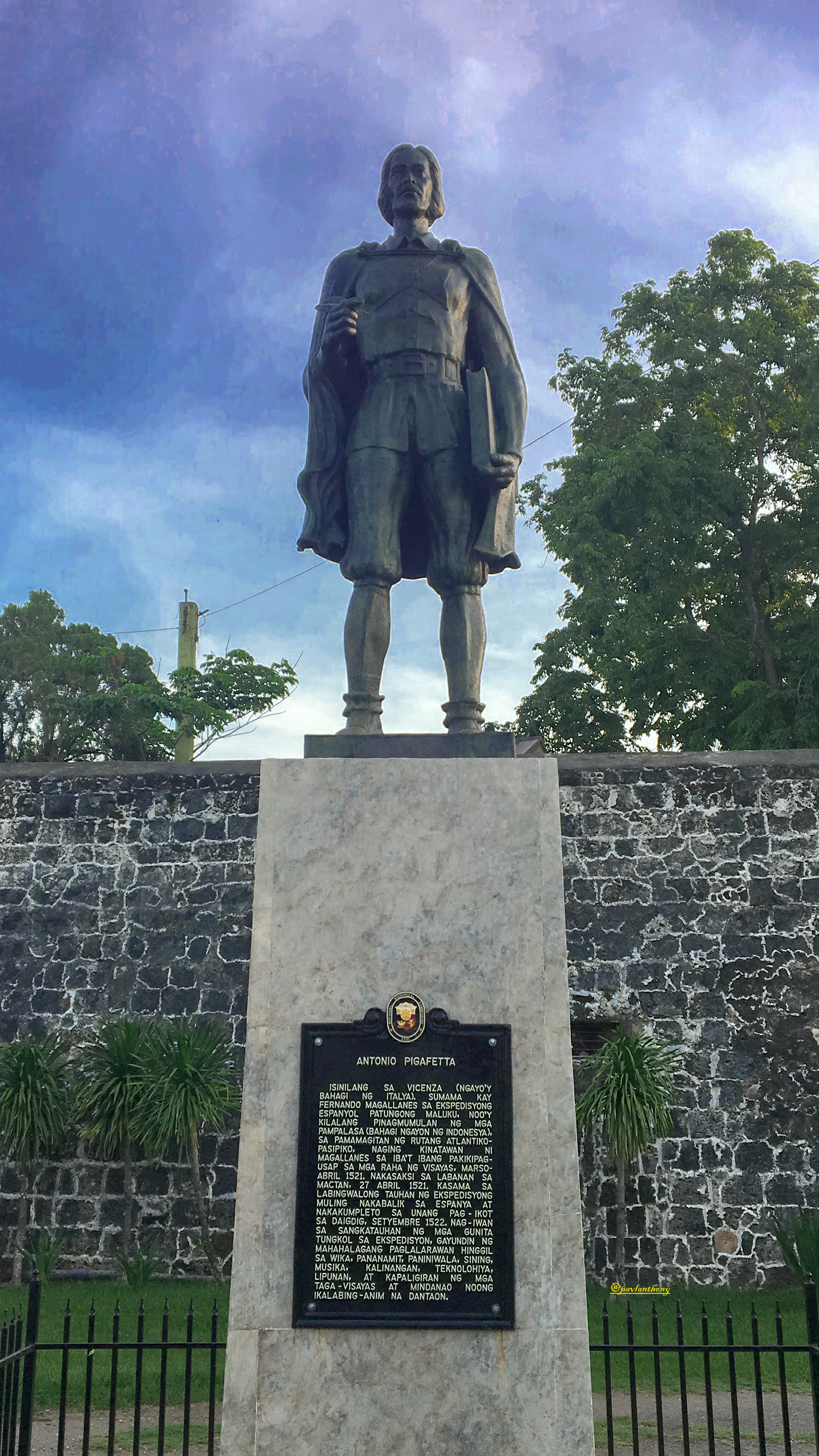
Antonio Pigafetta monument

Cebu Veterans Memorial
