= Fort San Pedro =

Bastioned fort in Cebu City, Philippines

- Kuta sa San Pedro (Cebuano)
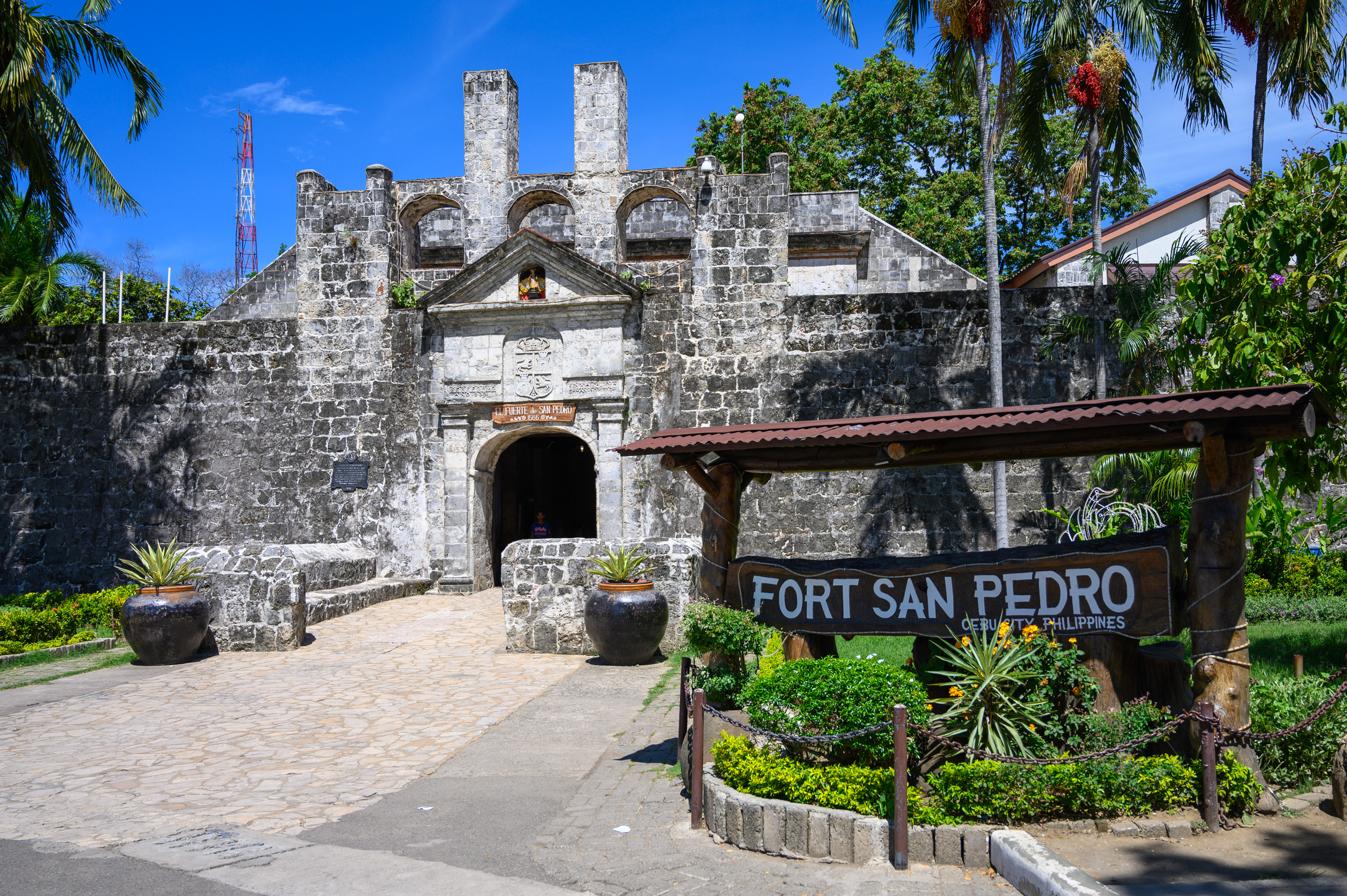
- Front entrance of Fuerte de San Pedro

- Location within Visayas Location within Philippines
- Alternative names: Fuerte de San Pedro, Moog ng San Pedro

General information
- Type: Bastioned fort
- Architectural style: Italian-Spanish school of fortification
- Location: Plaza Indepedencia, Cebu, Philippines
- Coordinates: 10°17′32″N 123°54′21″E
- Construction started: 1565

Technical details
- Structural system: Masonry
- Floor area: 2,025 square metres (21,800 sq ft)

Design and construction
- Designations: National Historical Landmark

Fort San Pedro (Spanish: Fuerte de San Pedro; Filipino: Moog ng San Pedro) is a military defense structure in Cebu, Philippines, built by the Spanish under the command of Miguel López de Legazpi, first governor of the Captaincy General of the Philippines. It is located in the area now called Plaza Independencia, in the pier area of the city. The original fort was made of wood and built after the arrival of Legazpi and his expedition. In the early 17th century a stone fort was built to repel Muslim raiders. Today's structure dates from 1738 and is the oldest triangular bastion fort in the country. It served as the nucleus of the first Spanish settlement in the Philippines. During the Philippine Revolution at the end of the 19th century, it was attacked and taken by Filipino revolutionaries, who used it as a stronghold.

== Background ==
Fuerte de San Pedro floor plan. A.) Fuerte de San Pedro. B.) Cuerpo de Guardia. C.) Vivienda del Teniente. D.) Almazanes. E.) Pezo. F.) Mana para los Golas. G.) Almacenes de Pólvora

The fort is triangular in shape, with two sides facing the sea and the third side fronting the land. The two sides facing the sea were defended with artillery and the front with a strong palisade made of wood. The three bastions are named La Concepción (southwest), Ignacio de Loyola (southeast), and San Miguel (northeast). It has a total inside area of 2,025 square metres (21,800 sq ft). The walls are 6.1 metres high by 2.4 metres thick (20 feet high by 8 feet thick), and the towers are 9.1 metres (30 ft) high from the ground level. The circumference is 380 metres (1,248 ft). The sides are of unequal lengths and the one fronting the city is where one may find entry into the fort. Fourteen cannons were mounted in their emplacements most of which are still there today. Work first started in 1565 with Miguel Lopéz de Legazpi breaking ground.

Little was known about the activity of the fort from the time it was built until two centuries later in 1739 when the king of Spain, Philip V, desired information regarding the island of Cebu. Governor-General Tamón, who was the Spanish ruler of the islands at the time made the following report:

Fuerte San Pedro, the fort is described as built of stone mortar with a terreplein where guns are mounted. The fort contains the necessary buildings. The largest of these buildings was the Cuerpo de Guardia where the personnel that manned the fort lived. Adjacent to it was the vivienda del teniente which was the living quarters of the lieutenant of the fort. In between the aforementioned buildings is a well. At one corner attached to the walls of the bastión San Miguel (NE) was the Almacenes de Pólvora (powder magazine).

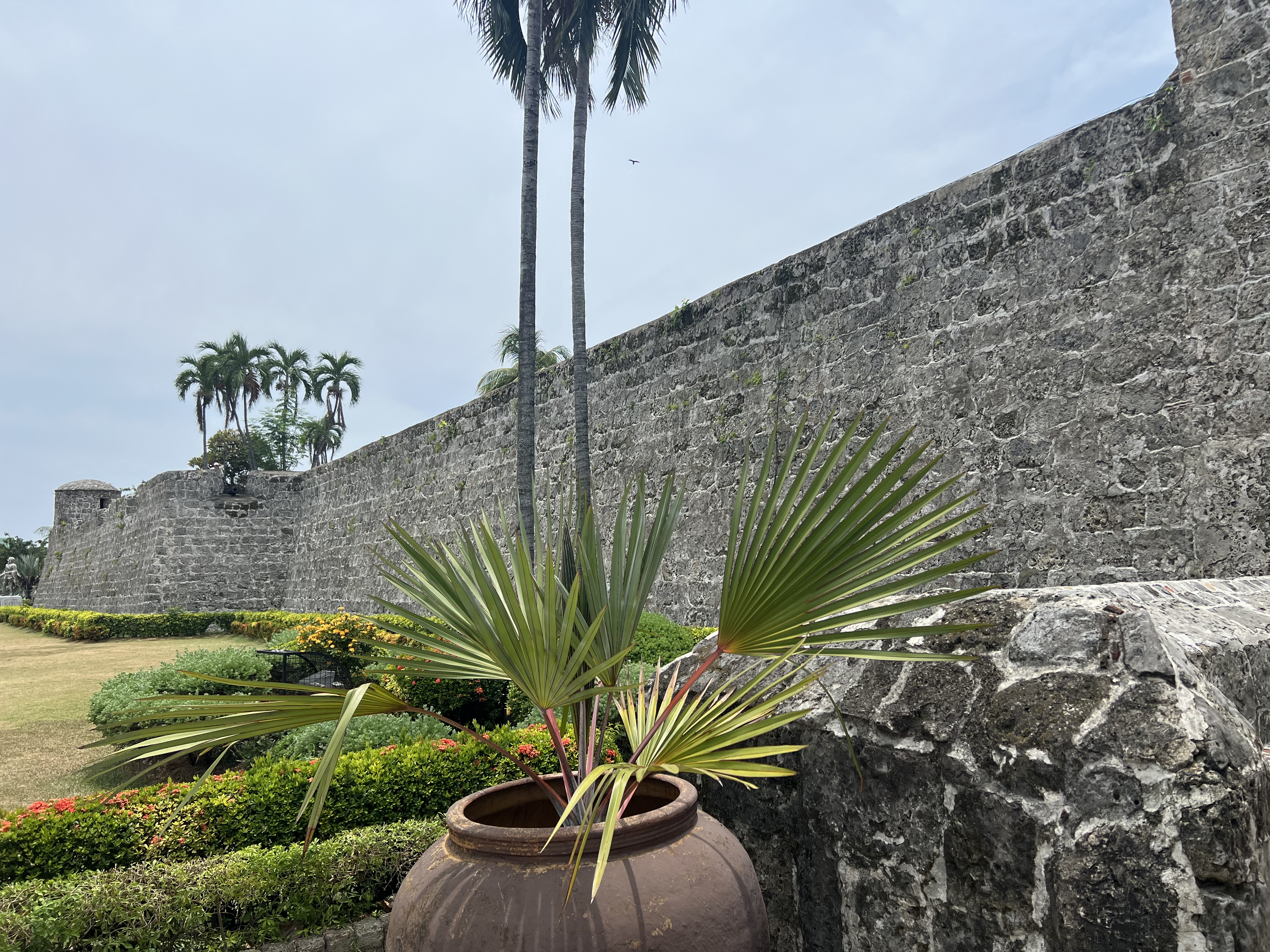
Fort walls

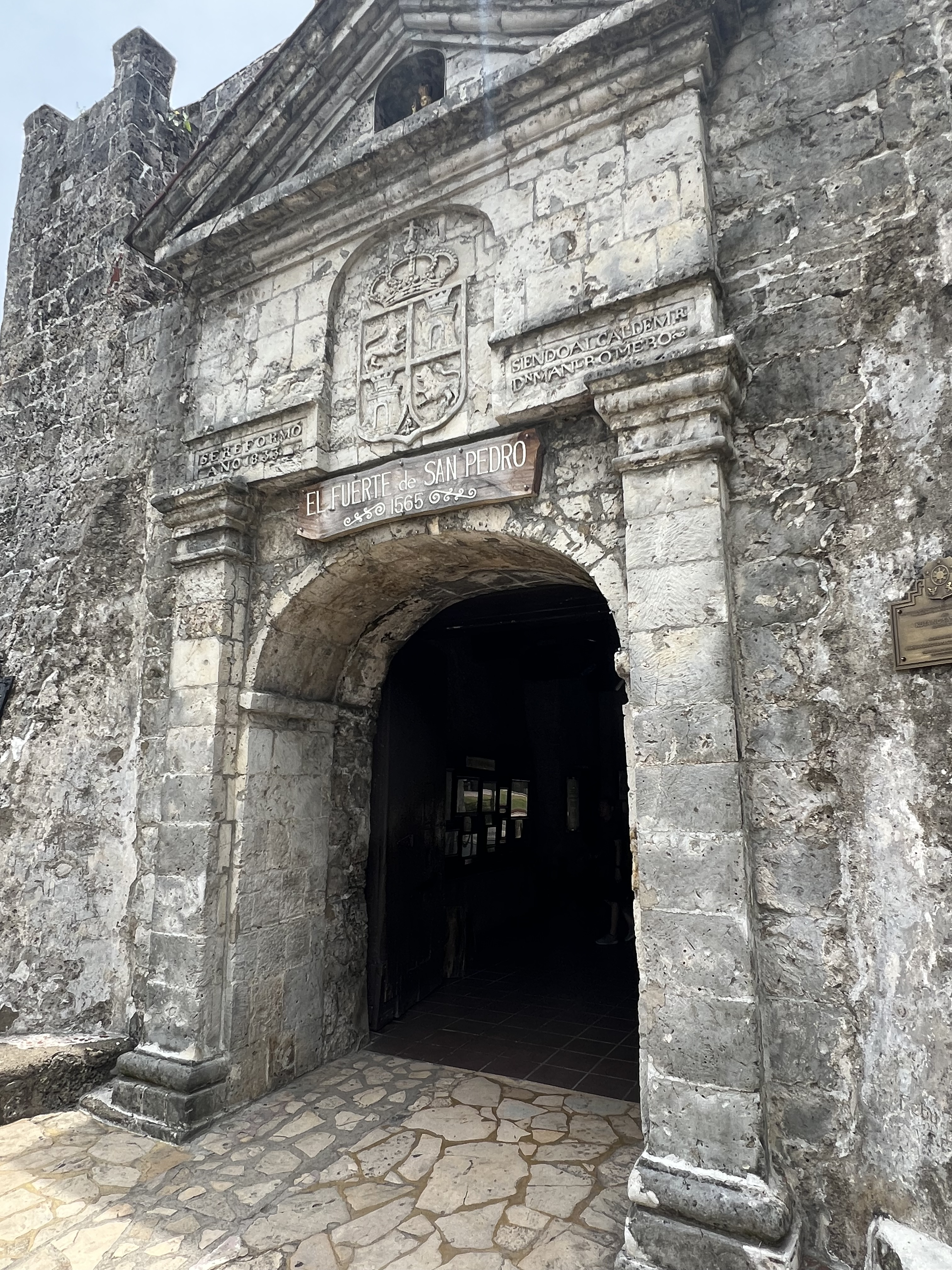
Closeup of entrance portal

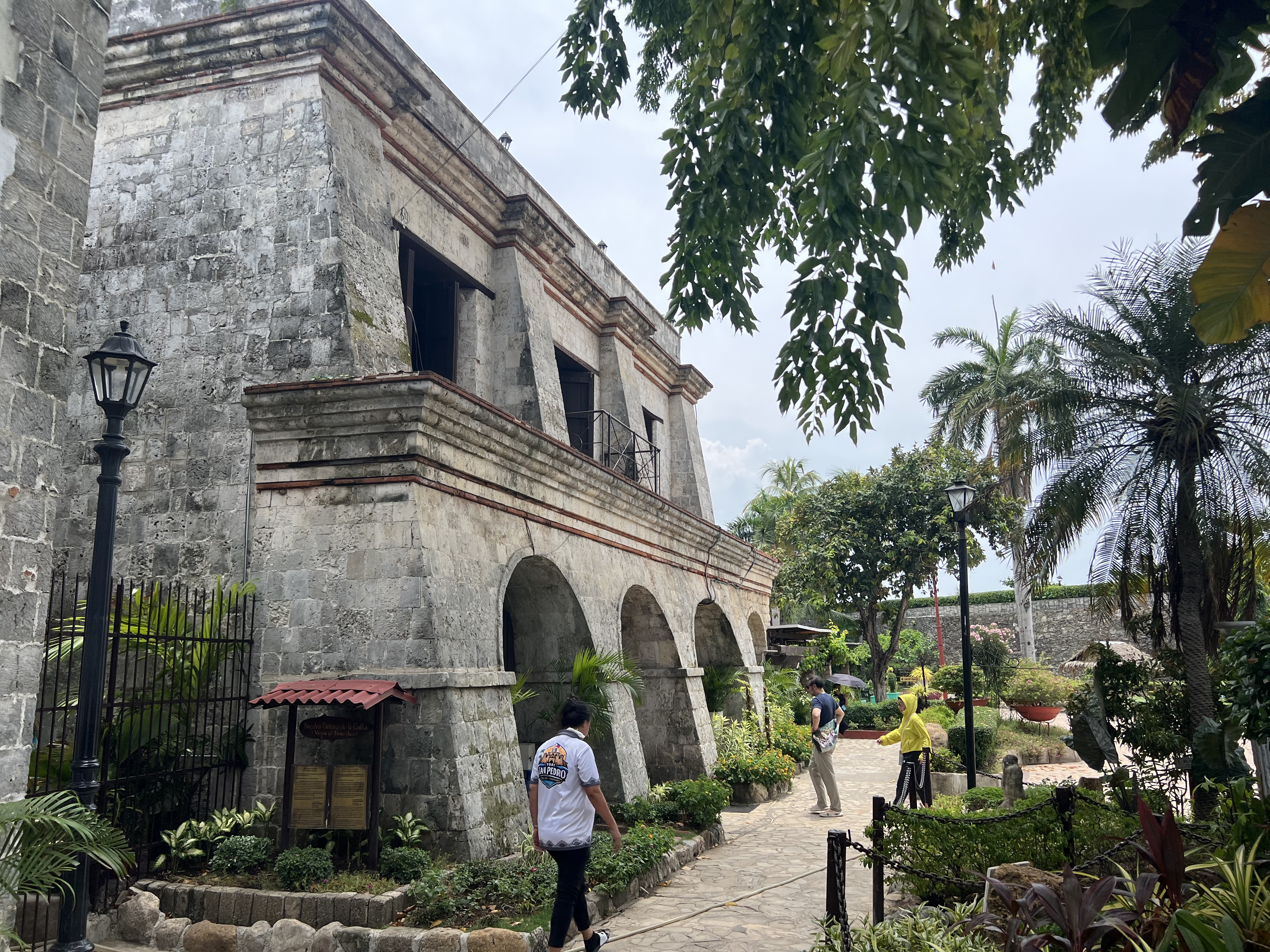
The portal from inside the fort

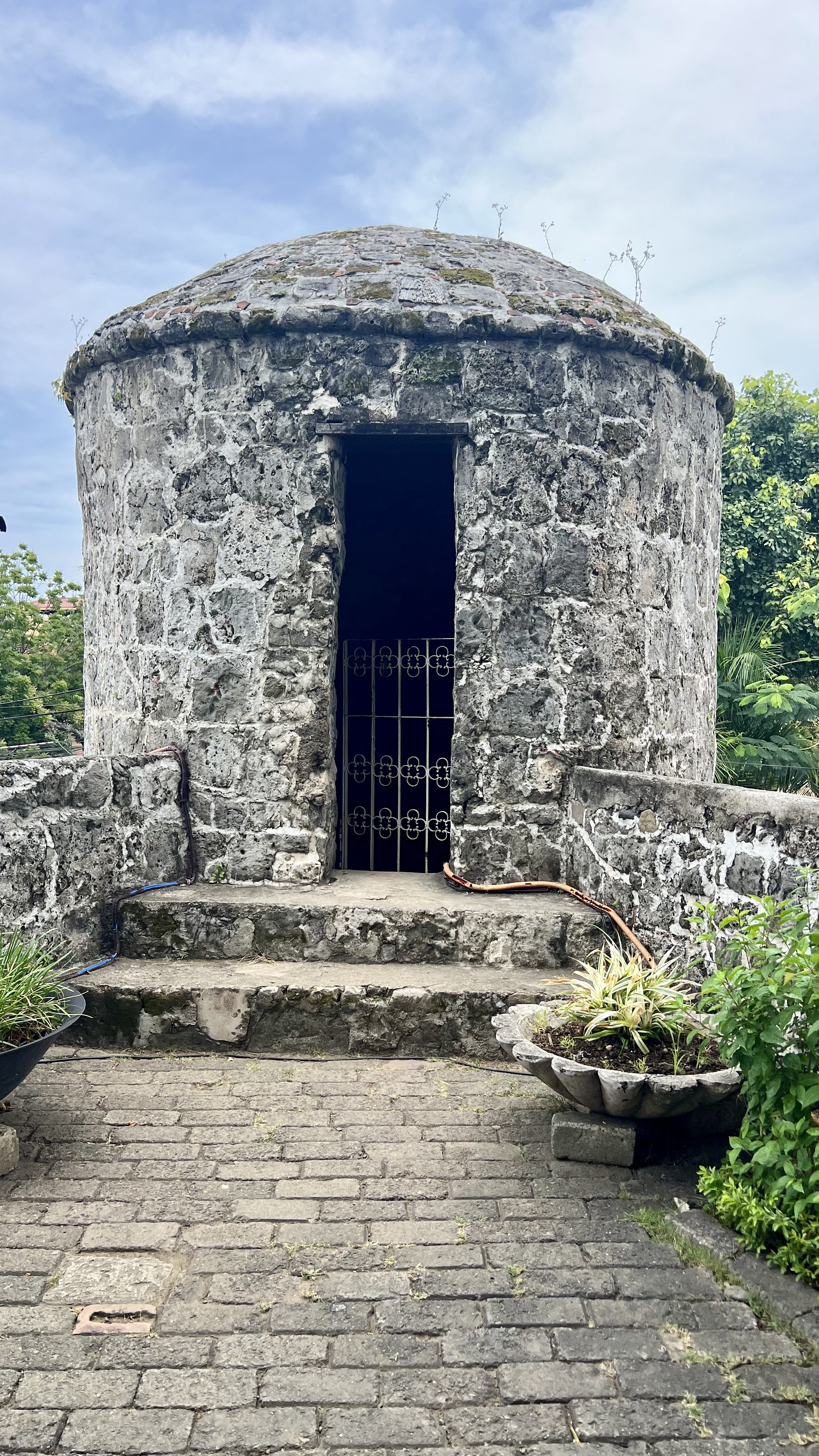
Bastion La Concepcion

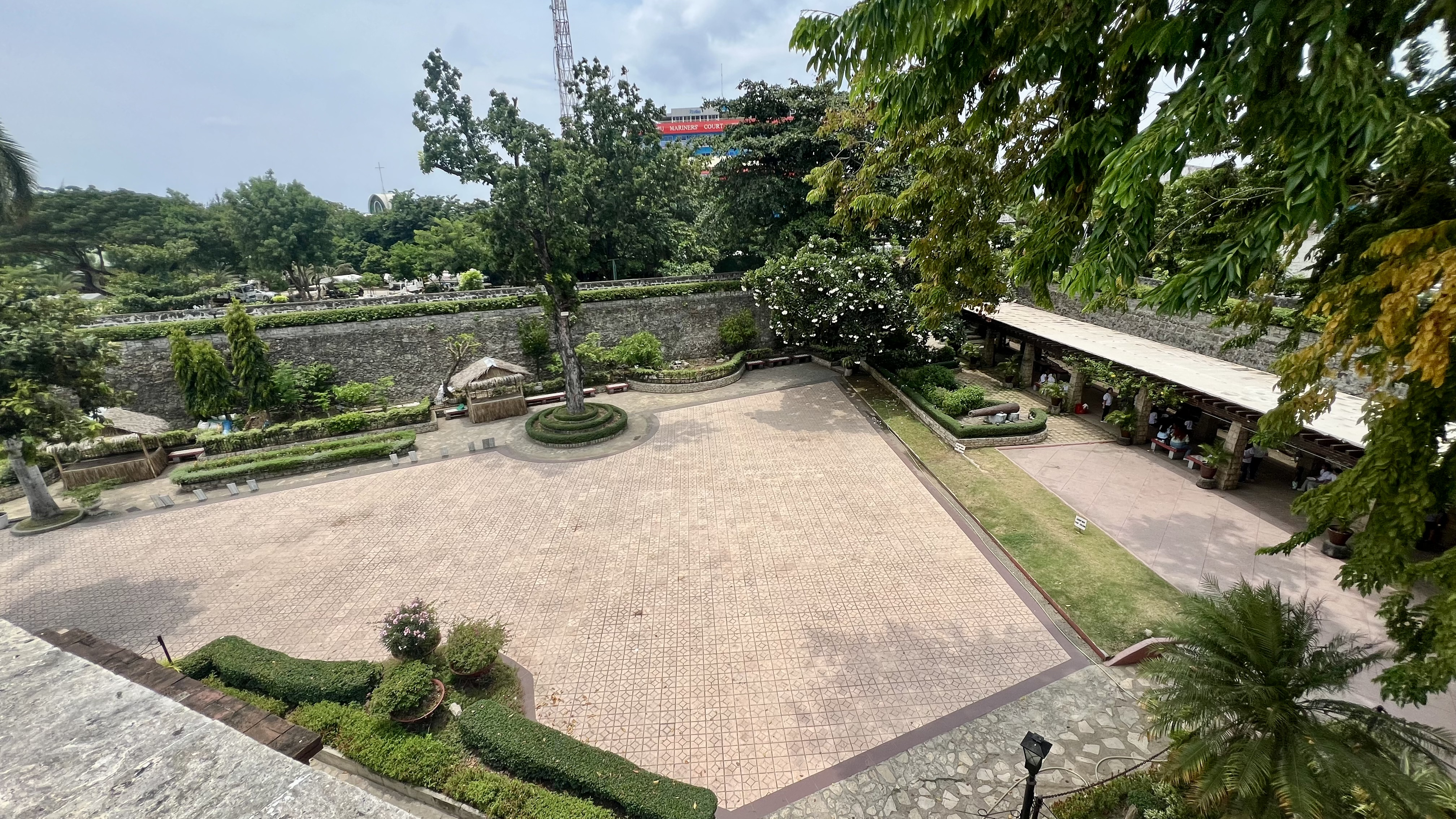
Interior courtyard

== History ==
The date of construction of the stone fort is uncertain, although there are claims that a Jesuit Antonio Campioni built a stone fort in 1630, and the gate of the fort bears the date 1738 together with the arms of Castile and Leon. It is certain, however, that the fort underwent major renovations in the late 19th century as part of a building program to improve Cebu.

The victory of the Americans led by Commodore Dewey at the Battle of Manila Bay on May 1, 1898, marked the end of the Spanish era in the Philippine Islands. The fort was then surrendered by the Spaniards to the Cebuano revolutionaries.

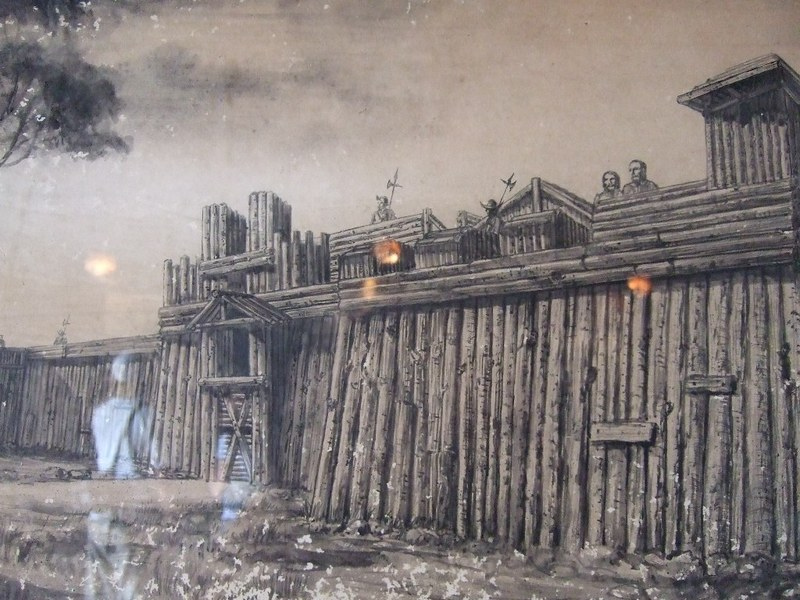
An illustration depicting what the fort may have looked like in 1565

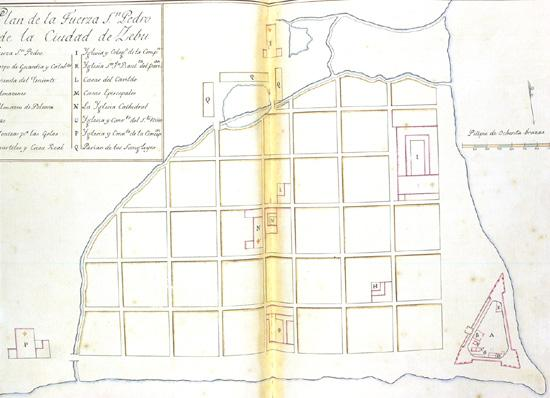
Location of Fuerte de San Pedro during 1643

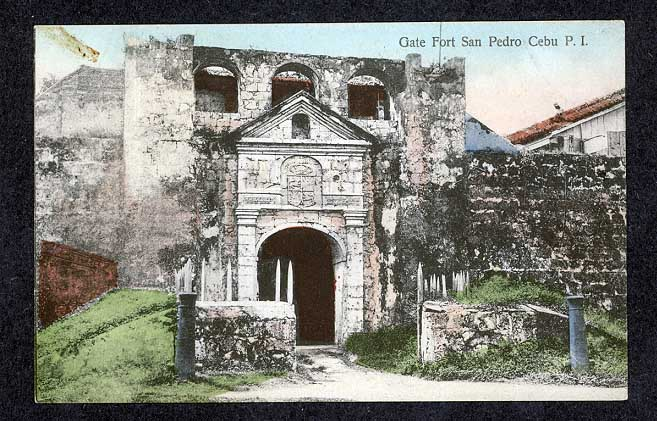
Front entrance ca. 1900

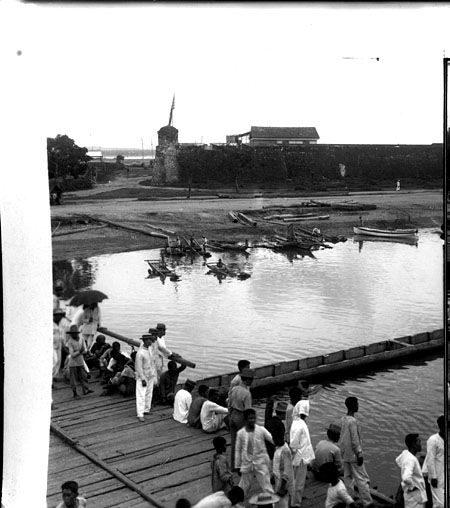
A view of the southwest Bastión La Concepción from the waterfront circa 1900

Fort San Pedro became a part of the American Warwick barracks during the American regime. From 1937 to 1941 the barracks was converted into a school where many Cebuanos received their formal education. During World War II from 1942 to 1945, Japanese residents of the city took refuge within the walls. When the battle to liberate the city of Cebu from the Imperial Japanese forces was fought, the fort served as an emergency hospital for the wounded.

From 1946 to 1950, Fort San Pedro was an army camp. After 1950, the Cebu Garden Club took over and fixed the inner part and converted it into a miniature garden.

Although already in ruins, the upper deck was utilized for different offices. First, as a clinic of the City Health, as office of the Presidential Arm and Community Development then the City Public Works Unit used the ruins of the lieutenant's quarters as its field office.

In 1957, Mayor Sergio Osmeña Jr. announced his intention to demolish Fort San Pedro and erect a new city hall on the same site. Opposition was voiced by the newspapers and magazines in Cebu City and Manila. Following pressure to drop the plan, Osmeña backtracked and stated that he would instead use the space behind the fort.

In the very same year, the city council commissioned "The Lamplighter", a religious sect, to manage a zoo subsidized by the city within the fort courtyard.

By 1968, the façade, quarters and walls of the original structures of Fort San Pedro were so obliterated that only the two towers were recognizable. Plans for the restoration of the fort was started, and the zoo was relocated.

Plans and estimates for the restoration of the fort were completed by architect Leonardo Concepción, who had completed his Master of Arts in building restoration in Madrid. The project was jointly funded by the Board of Travel Industry (now Department of Tourism), the Cebu City government, and the Cebu Zonta Club.

The Fort San Pedro restoration was a tedious, time and labor consuming project. To restore the fort as close to the original as possible, coral stones hauled from under the sea along Cebu coastal towns were utilized. Delivered crudely cut to the restoration site, the fort laborers did the final cutting and polishing to make the blocks fit each other.

Work progressed slowly but the façade, the main building (Cuerpo de Guardia), the walk and the observatory roof garden were faithfully restored after one and a half years. To make the project functional, the restored main building served as the Cebu office of the Department of Tourism, the lieutenant's quarters now houses a museum, the inner court is an open-air theater and its immediate vicinity is a park.

At present, the fort is under the care and administration of the Cebu City government, as a historical park under City Executive Order No. 08-87 of February 20, 2008. This order created the Plaza Independencia – Fort San Pedro Interim Policy and Advisory Board (PIFSIPAB), and Hon. Michael L. Rama was appointed as the overall overseer of the Plaza Independencia and Fort San Pedro. The land on which it is situated is, however, owned by the Department of Environment and Natural Resources.

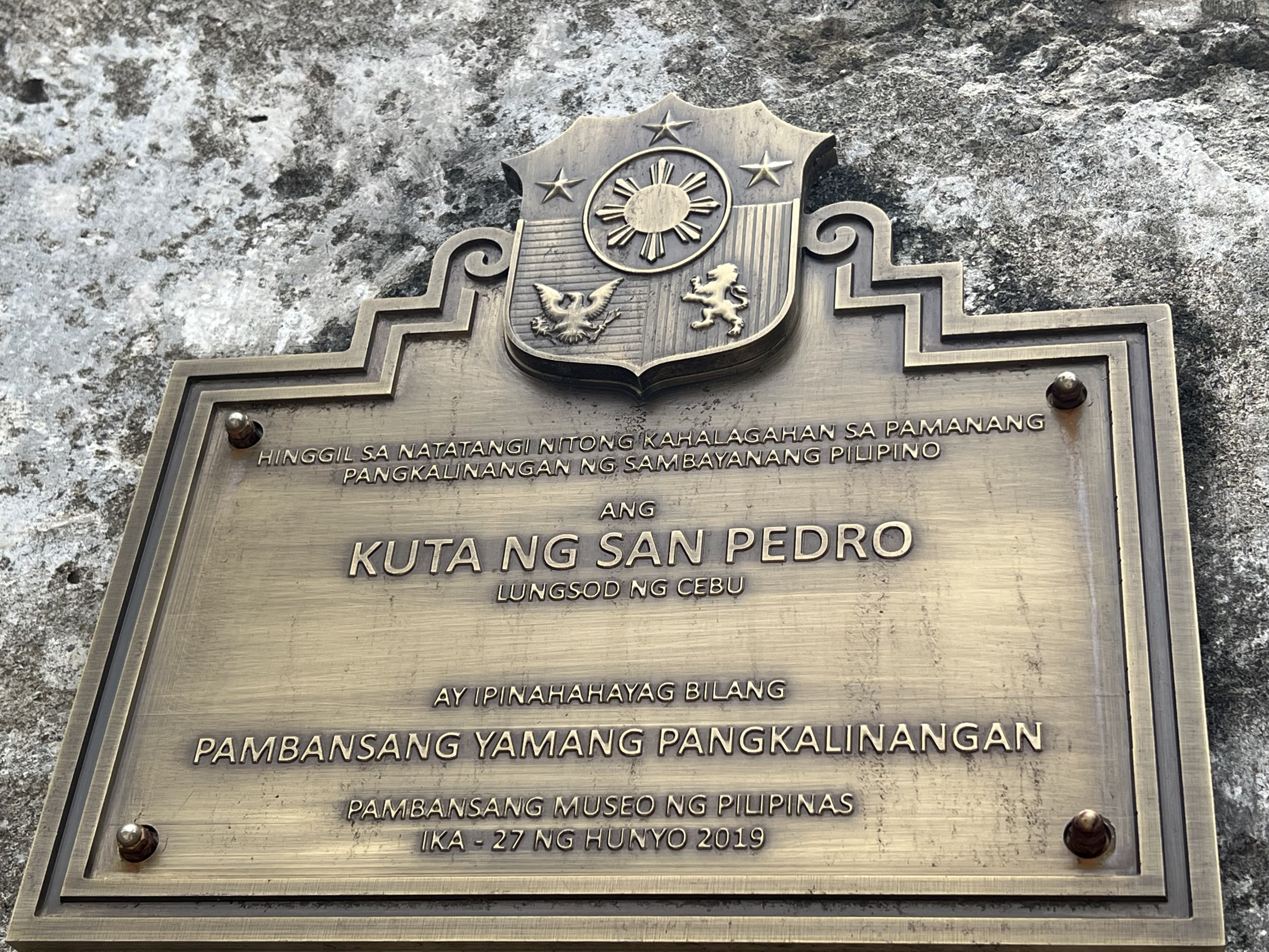
National Cultural Treasure marker

The fort was damaged by the 7.2 magnitude earthquake that struck Cebu and other parts of the Visayas in 2013, after which repairs were made. In 2020, the fort was declared a National Cultural Treasure.

The fort was again damaged by Typhoon Odette in 2021, after which a P11 million rehabilitation plan was announced in 2024. In the 2025 Cebu earthquake, Fort San Pedro was damaged yet again.

Part of the fort currently houses a museum. The fort houses legacies of the Spanish government: well preserved Spanish artifacts such as Spanish documents, paintings and sculpture. A large statue of Legazpi and Antonio Pigafetta may be seen outside the fort walls.

== See also ==
- Fort San Pedro (Iloilo)
