= Rizal Avenue (disambiguation) =

Rizal Avenue primarily is a road in Caloocan and Manila, Philippines.

Rizal Avenue may also refer to the following roads in the Philippines:

- Rizal Avenue in Albuera, part of the Pan-Philippine Highway
- Rizal Avenue in Candelaria, part of the Pan-Philippine Highway
- Rizal Avenue in Digos, part of the Pan-Philippine Highway
- Rizal Avenue in Lanao del Sur, part of the Pan-Philippine Highway
- Rizal Avenue in Olongapo, part of the N305 highway (Philippines) and N3 highway (Philippines)
- Rizal Avenue in Sorsogon City, part of the Pan-Philippine Highway
- Rizal Avenue in Taytay, Rizal, part of N601 highway (Philippines)
- Rizal Avenue in Tukuran, part of the Pan-Philippine Highway
- Rizal Avenue Extension in Catbalogan, part of the Pan-Philippine Highway
- Rizal Avenue Extension in Malabon, alternate name of Paterio Aquino Avenue
- José Rizal Avenue in San Pablo, Laguna, part of N67 highway (Philippines)
- J. P. Rizal Avenue in Binangonan, part of the Manila East Road
- J. P. Rizal Avenue in Laoag, part of the Pan-Philippine Highway
- J. P. Rizal Avenue, a tertiary road in Makati and Taguig
- J. P. Rizal Avenue in Pagadian, part of the Pan-Philippine Highway
