= Dr. Jose P. Rizal Street =

Street in Cebu City, Philippines

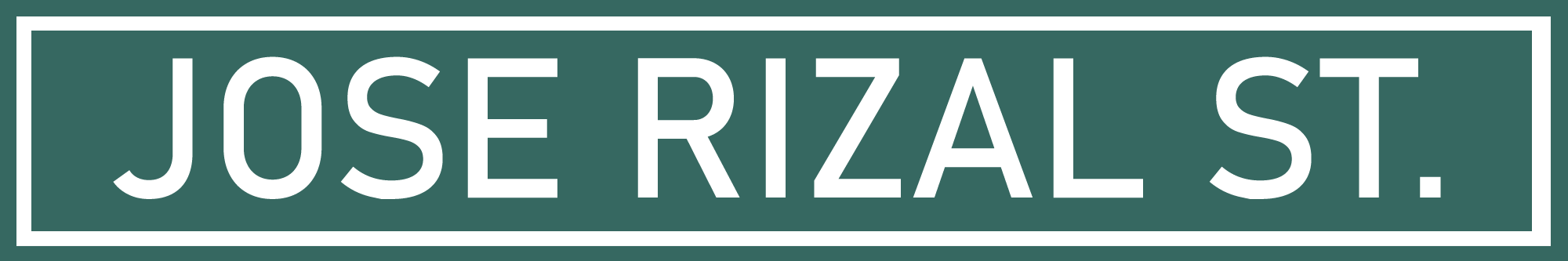
- Jose Rizal Street
- Native name: Dalan Dr. Jose P. Rizal (Cebuano)
- Former names: A. Del Rosario Street; Cebu City Hall Lane
- Namesake: Jose Rizal
- Length: 0.12 km (0.075 mi); Based on Google Maps
- Location: Cebu City, Cebu, Philippines
- East end: P. Burgos Street
- West end: D. Jakosalem Street

Dr. Jose P. Rizal Street (Cebuano: Dalan Dr. Jose P. Rizal), also known as Jose Rizal Street, is a short local road in Cebu City, Cebu, Philippines. It commences at P. Burgos Street as a one-way lane passing through the Legislative Building of the Cebu City Hall and ends at D. Jakosalem Street.

Originally named as A. Del Rosario Street in honor of Anacleto del Rosario who was regarded as the "Father of Philippine Science", it was renamed into Cebu City Hall Lane on November 4, 1998 by virtue of City Ordinance No. 1734 passed by the Cebu City Council.

On June 19, 2018, during the commemoration of Jose Rizal's 157th birth anniversary, then vice mayor Edgardo Labella along with other city officials led the unveiling of Dr. Jose P. Rizal Street after the city council on June 5, 2018 unanimously approved City Ordinance No. 2495 renaming Cebu City Hall Lane. The proposal was lobbied by Cebu's Knights of Rizal since the city did not have any street named after the country's national hero after Rizal Lane was renamed into N. Bacalso Avenue on March 7, 1984 with the passage of Batas Pambansa Bilang 648.
