= Ronald Duterte =

Filipino politician and lawyer

Mayor of Cebu City
- In office 1983 – March 25, 1986
- Vice Mayor: Vicente Kintanar Jr.
- Preceded by: Florentino Solon
- Succeeded by: John Henry Osmeña (OIC)

Vice Mayor of Cebu City
- In office December 31, 1980 – 1983
- Mayor: Florentino Solon
- Preceded by: Eulogio Borres
- Succeeded by: Vicente Kintanar Jr.

Member of the Cebu City Council
- In office December 31, 1963 – December 31, 1980

Personal details
- Born: Ronald Regis Duterte; January 15, 1934 Cebu, Cebu, Philippine Islands
- Died: June 26, 2016 (aged 82) Cebu City, Philippines
- Party: Kilusang Bagong Lipunan (1970s)
- Other political affiliations: Liberal (1963–1970s)
- Spouse: Gloria Parinas Duterte
- Children: 3
- Relatives: Rodrigo Duterte (cousin); Duterte family
- Education: University of Southern Philippines (LLB)
- Profession: Politician, Lawyer

Ronald Regis Duterte (January 15, 1934 – June 26, 2016) was a Filipino politician and lawyer who served as the mayor of Cebu City from 1983 to 1986. Prior to becoming mayor, he served as the vice mayor of the said city from 1980 to 1983 and was a member of the City Council for three consecutive terms from 1963 to 1980.

== Early life and education ==
Duterte was the son of Ramon Gonzales Duterte Sr. and Rosario Regis. His father was the brother of Vicente Duterte, former mayor of Danao and governor of Davao, making him a first cousin of the 16th Philippine president Rodrigo Duterte.

He was admitted to the Philippine Bar on March 2, 1956. He later earned a master's degree in comparative law at Columbia Law School of Columbia University and in 1960, a doctor of laws at the Universidad de Madrid.

== Political career ==
He started his political career as councilor after winning in the 1963 elections under the group of Sergio Osmeña Jr. He went on to be re-elected in 1967 and in 1971, where he placed first among candidates for councilor. As councilor, Duterte authored 44 ordinances. In 1980, he became the fourth elected vice mayor of Cebu City.

Then-Mayor Florentino Solon had to resign from his position in 1983 after he was appointed by then president Ferdinand Marcos to become Deputy Minister of Health. This led to Duterte's accession into office as mayor with Vicente Kintanar Jr., who was then the city's first-rank councilor, becoming the city's new vice mayor.

Duterte was a member of the Liberal ticket as an ally of Osmeña, before later transferring to the ruling Kilusang Bagong Lipunan party under the Marcos dictatorship.

== Post-mayoral career ==
After his stint as mayor, Duterte in 1991 became the president of then University of Southern Philippines (USP) and later on as dean of its college of law. As university president, he led the gradual reopening of USP's college operations.

== Personal life ==
Duterte was married to Gloria Parinas, the 1964 Miss Hawaii Filipina. They had three children namely Kathleen Genevieve, Alison Christine and Ronald Patrick II.

== Death ==
Duterte died at the age of 82 on June 26, 2016.

Political offices
Preceded by John Henry Osmeña	Vice Mayor of Cebu City; September 13, 1971–December 31, 1971	Succeeded by Eulogio Borres
Preceded by Eulogio Borres	Vice Mayor of Cebu City; December 31, 1980–1983	Succeeded by Vicente Kintanar Jr.
Preceded by Florentino Solon	Mayor of Cebu City; 1983–1986	Succeeded by John Henry Osmeña; Officer in charge
