= List of Sinulog Festival winners =

The following is a list of the Sinulog Grand Parade winners from 1982 to present.

== 1982–1991 ==
Year	Category	Winning Contingent	Ref.
1982	Parade Participation	Southwestern University	
1982	Diana	Brgy. Mabolo	
1982	Float	NEDA	
1982	On-Route Décor	Gaisano, Inc.	
1982	On-Site Décor	Gaw Trading, Inc.	
1983	Sinulog-based	CSAT	
1983	Free Interpretation	Central Phil. Navy Facility	
1983	Floats (Free Interpretation)	GAW Trading	
1983	Floats (Sinulog-Based)	NEDA	
1983	Diana	Brgy. T. Padilla	
1984	Parade Participation	Brgy. T. Padilla	
1984	Diana	Brgy. Pasil	
1984	Float	NEDA	
1985	Parade Participation	Cebu State College of Science & Technology	
1985	Float	NEDA	
1986	Parade Participation	Mandaue City Government	
1986	Barangay	Brgy. T. Padilla	
1986	Collegiate	University of Southern Philippines	
1986	Secondary	Don Sergio Osmeña High School	
1986	Government Agency	Mandaue City Government	
1986	Commercial	Coca- Cola	
1986	Float	NEDA	
1986	On Route Décor	Gaisano Colon	
1987	Barangay Category	T. Padilla	
1987	Elementary/Secondary	Don Osmeña Sr. Memorial H.S.	
1987	Collegiate/Vocational	Southwestern University	
1987	Gov’t. Agencies	Phil. Coast Guard/Phil. Navy	
1987	Commercial	Coca- Cola	
1987	On Route Décor Contest	GAW Trading, Inc.	
1987	Float	Salazar Institute of Technology	
1988	Grand Prize	Coca-Cola	
1988	Free Interpretation	Landonian	
1988	Barangay	Sandels Magdaragat sa Pasil	
1988	Public Schools	Holy Rosary School of Pardo	
1988	Private Schools	Southwestern University	
1988	Commercial	Coca-Cola	
1988	Government Agencies	DSWD Lingab Center-Street Children	
1988	Fluvial Parade	M/T julvir	
1988	Route Decor	PLDT	
1988	Float	IPI	
1989	Sinulog-based	Coca-Cola Cultural Dancers	
1989	Free Interpretation	Cebu Central Colleges	
1989	Barangay/Government Division	Dept. of Education Cultural & Sports Cebu Province	
1989	Private School Division	Southwestern University	
1989	Commercial Sector	Coca-Cola	
1989	Float	DPWH	
1990	Era I	Consolacion Municipal High School	
1990	Era II	Cebu Central Colleges	
1990	Era III	International Pharmaceuticals Inc.	
1990	Open Category (Era V)	Bonokbonok Maradjao-Karadjao Festival - Surigao City	
1990	Float	Shemberg Marketing	
1991	Parade Category	Tribu Malitbog - Malitbog, Southern Leyte	
1991	Arches	Cebu Green Island Club	
1991	Float	Shemberg Mktg. Corp.	

== 1992–present ==
Year	Sinulog-based Category		Free Interpretation Category		Street Dancing		Ref.
Year	Contingent	Hometown	Contingent	Hometown	Contingent	Hometown	Ref.
1992	Southwestern University	N/A	Bonokbonok Maradjao-Karadjao Festival	Surigao City, Surigao del Norte	Not Awarded		
1993	Southwestern University	N/A	Province of Camiguin	Camiguin	Not Awarded		
1994	H.Lhuillier	N/A	Surigao City	Surigao City, Surigao del Norte	Not Awarded		
1995	Southwestern University	N/A	Butuan City	Butuan City, Agusan del Norte	Not Awarded		
1996	San Diego Dance Company	N/A	Butuan City	Butuan City, Agusan del Norte	Not Awarded		
1997	San Diego Dance Company	N/A	Tribu Kandaya	Daanbantayan, Cebu	Not Awarded		
1998	Southwestern University	N/A	Buyawanong Placer	Placer, Surigao del Norte	Not Awarded		
1999	Southwestern University	N/A	Lumad sa PLDT	N/A	Not Awarded		
2000	Banay Opaono - Mandaue City Science High School & Don Gerardo Memorial HS	Mandaue, Cebu	Sinanduloy Cultural Troupe	Tangub City, Misamis Occidental	Not Awarded		
2001	Lahug Elementary School	Lahug, Cebu City	Sinanduloy Cultural Troupe	Tangub City, Misamis Occidental	Not Awarded		
2002	Sinanduloy Cultural Troupe	Tangub City, Misamis Occidental	Parañaque City	Parañaque City	Sinanduloy Cultural Troupe	Tangub City, Misamis Occidental	
2003	Sinanduloy Cultural Troupe	Tangub City, Misamis Occidental	Tribu Kandaya	Daanbantayan, Cebu	Sinanduloy Cultural Troupe	Tangub City, Misamis Occidental	
2004	Compostela National High School	Compostela, Cebu	Tribu Lumad Basakanon	Basak San Nicolas, Cebu City	Cebu City Central School & LC Electronics/Conpinco Trading	Cebu City	
2005	Sinanduloy Cultural Troupe	Tangub City, Misamis Occidental	Tribu Lumad Basakanon	Basak San Nicolas, Cebu City	Yagyag Festival	Sibulan, Negros Oriental	
2006	Sinanduloy Cultural Troupe	Tangub City, Misamis Occidental	Province of Camiguin	Camuiguin	Sinanduloy Cultural Troupe	Tangub City, Misamis Occidental	
2007	Sinanduloy Cultural Troupe	Tangub City, Misamis Occidental	Tribu Lumad Basakanon	Basak San Nicolas, Cebu City	Sinanduloy Cultural Troupe	Tangub City, Misamis Occidental	
2008	Alcoy Siloy Festival	Alcoy, Cebu	Tribu Lumad Basakanon	Basak San Nicolas, Cebu City	Sinanduloy Cultural Troupe	Tangub City, Misamis Occidental	
2009	Sinanduloy Cultural Troupe	Tangub City, Misamis Occidental	Tribu Buyoganon	Abuyog, Leyte	Sinanduloy Cultural Troupe	Tangub City, Misamis Occidental	
2010	Sinanduloy Cultural Troupe	Tangub City, Misamis Occidental	Tribu Himag-Ulaw	Placer, Masbate	Sinanduloy Cultural Troupe	Tangub City, Misamis Occidental	
2011	Sinanduloy Cultural Troupe	Tangub City, Misamis Occidental	Tribu Himag-Ulaw	Placer, Masbate	Sinanduloy Cultural Troupe	Tangub City, Misamis Occidental	
2012	Kulturang Placereño	Placer, Masbate	Tribu Lingganay	Alang-Alang, Leyte	Carcar City Division	Carcar, Cebu	
2013	Sinanduloy Cultural Troupe	Tangub City, Misamis Occidental	Tribu Lingganay	Alang-Alang, Leyte	Sinanduloy Cultural Troupe	Tangub City, Misamis Occidental	
2014	Kulturang Placereño	Placer, Masbate	Tribu Lumad Basakanon	Basak San Nicolas, Cebu City	Tribu Lumad Basakanon	Basak San Nicolas, Cebu City	
2015	Kulturang Placereño	Placer, Masbate	Tribu Buyoganon	Abuyog, Leyte	Tribu Lumad Basakanon	Basak San Nicolas, Cebu City	
2016	Kulturang Placereño	Placer, Masbate	Land of Beauty and Bounty	Lanao del Norte	Tribu Buyoganon	Abuyog, Leyte	
2017	Sinanduloy Cultural Troupe	Tangub City, Misamis Occidental	Land of Beauty and Bounty	Lanao del Norte	Tribu Katbalaugan	Catbalogan City, Samar	
2018	Carcar City Division	Carcar, Cebu	Tribu Kandaya	Daanbantayan, Cebu	Tribu Buyoganon	Abuyog, Leyte	
2019	Carcar City Division	Carcar, Cebu	Tribu Malipayon	Consolacion, Cebu	Carcar City Division	Carcar, Cebu	
2020	Sinanduloy Cultural Troupe	Tangub City, Misamis Occidental	Tribu Lumad Basakanon	Basak San Nicolas, Cebu City	Sinanduloy Cultural Troupe	Tangub City, Misamis Occidental	
2021	Cancelled due to COVID-19 pandemic.						
2022	Cancelled due to COVID-19 pandemic and Typhoon Odette aftermath.						
2023	Inayawan Talent Guild and Cultural Group	Inayawan, Cebu City	Omega de Salonera	Surigao del Norte	Omega de Salonera	Surigao del Norte	
2024	Banauan Cultural Group	Guadalupe, Cebu City	Pasayaw Festival	Canlaon City, Negros Oriental	Tribu Lumad Basakanon	Basak San Nicolas, Cebu City	
2025	Carcar City Division	Carcar, Cebu	Bais City Festival of Harvest	Bais City, Negros Oriental	Carcar City Division	Carcar, Cebu	
2026	Tagbilaran City Contingent	Tagbilaran City, Bohol	Tribu Masadyaon	Toledo City, Cebu	Tribu Masadyaon	Toledo City, Cebu	

== Contingents by number of wins ==
This list only includes the winners from 1992 to present.

=== Sinulog-based Category ===
Contingents	Titles	Year(s)	Hometown
Sinanduloy Cultural Troupe	11	2002, 2003, 2005, 2006, 2007, 2009, 2010, 2011, 2013, 2017, 2020	Tangub City, Misamis Occidental
Southwestern University	5	1992, 1993, 1995, 1998, 1999	Cebu City
Kulturang Placereño	4	2012, 2014, 2015, 2016	Placer, Masbate
Carcar City Division	3	2018, 2019, 2025	Carcar City, Cebu
San Diego Dance Company	2	1996, 1997	Cebu City
Tagbilaran City Contingent	1	2026	Tagbilaran City, Bohol
Banauan Cultural Group	1	2024	Guadalupe, Cebu City
Inayawan Talent Guild and Cultural Group	1	2023	Inayawan, Cebu City
Alcoy Soloy Festival	1	2008	Alcoy, Cebu
Compostela National High School	1	2004	Compostela, Cebu
Lahug Elementary School	1	2001	Lahug, Cebu City
Banay Opaono	1	2000	Mandaue, Cebu
H.Lhuillier	1	1994	Cebu City

=== Free-Interpretative Category ===
Contingents	Titles	Year(s)	Hometown
Tribu Lumad Basakanon	6	2004, 2005, 2007, 2008, 2014, 2020	Basak San Nicolas, Cebu City
Tribu Kandaya	3	1997, 2003, 2018	Daanbantayan, Cebu
Land of Beauty and Bounty	2	2016, 2017	Lanao del Norte
Tribu Lingganay	2	2012, 2013	Alang-Alang, Leyte
Tribu Himag-Ulaw	2	2010, 2011	Placer, Masbate
Tribu Buyoganon	2	2009, 2015	Abuyog, Leyte
Sinanduloy Cultural Troupe	2	2000, 2001	Tangub City, Misamis Occidental
Butuan City	2	1995, 1996	Butuan City, Agusan del Norte
Province of Camiguin	2	1993, 2006	Camiguin
Tribu Masadyaon	1	2026	Toledo City, Cebu
Bais City Festival of Harvest	1	2025	Bais City, Negros Oriental
Pasayaw Festival	1	2024	Canlaon City, Negros Oriental
Omega de Salonera	1	2023	Surigao del Norte
Tribu Malipayon	1	2019	Consolacion, Cebu
Parañaque City	1	2002	Parañaque City
Lumad sa PLDT	1	1999	Cebu City
Buyawanong Placer	1	1998	Placer, Surigao del Norte
Surigao City	1	1994	Surigao City, Surigao del Norte
Bonokbonok Maradjao-Karadjao Festival	1	1992	Surigao City, Surigao del Norte

=== Street Dancing Category ===
Contingents	Titles	Year(s)	Hometown
Sinanduloy Cultural Troupe	10	2002, 2003, 2006, 2007, 2008, 2009, 2010, 2011, 2013, 2020	Tangub City, Misamis Occidental
Carcar City Division	3	2012, 2019, 2025	Carcar, Cebu
Tribu Lumad Basakanon	3	2014, 2015, 2024	Basak San Nicolas, Cebu City
Tribu Buyoganon	2	2016, 2018	Abuyog, Leyte
Tribu Masadyaon	1	2026	Toledo City, Cebu
Omega de Salonera	1	2023	Surigao del Norte
Tribu Katbalaugan	1	2017	Catbalogan City, Samar
Yagyag Festival	1	2005	Sibulan, Negros Oriental
Cebu City Central School	1	2004	Cebu City

== Hometown by number of wins ==
This list only includes the winners from 1992 to present.

=== Sinulog-based Category ===
Province	Titles	Year(s)
Misamis Occidental	11	2002, 2003, 2005, 2006, 2007, 2009, 2010, 2011, 2013, 2017, 2020
Cebu City	11	1992, 1993, 1994, 1995, 1996, 1997, 1998, 1999, 2001, 2023, 2024
Cebu Province	6	2000, 2004, 2008, 2018, 2019, 2025
Masbate	4	2012, 2014, 2015, 2016
Bohol	1	2026

=== Free-Interpretative Category ===
Province	Titles	Year(s)
Cebu City	7	1999, 2004, 2005, 2007, 2008, 2014, 2020
Cebu Province	5	1997, 2003, 2018, 2019, 2026
Surigao del Norte	4	1992, 1994, 1998, 2023
Leyte	4	2009, 2012, 2013, 2015
Negros Oriental	2	2024, 2025
Lanao del Norte	2	2016, 2017
Masbate	2	2010, 2011
Camiguin	2	1993, 2006
Misamis Occidental	2	2000, 2001
Agusan del Norte	2	1995, 1996
Parañaque City	1	2002

=== Street Dancing Category ===
Province	Titles	Year(s)
Misamis Occidental	10	2002, 2003, 2006, 2007, 2008, 2009, 2010, 2011, 2013, 2020
Cebu City	4	2004, 2014, 2015, 2024
Cebu Province	4	2012, 2019, 2025, 2026
Leyte	2	2016, 2018
Surigao del Norte	1	2023
Samar	1	2017
Negros Oriental	1	2005

== See also ==
- Sinulog
