= Carbon Market =

Market in Cebu City, Philippines

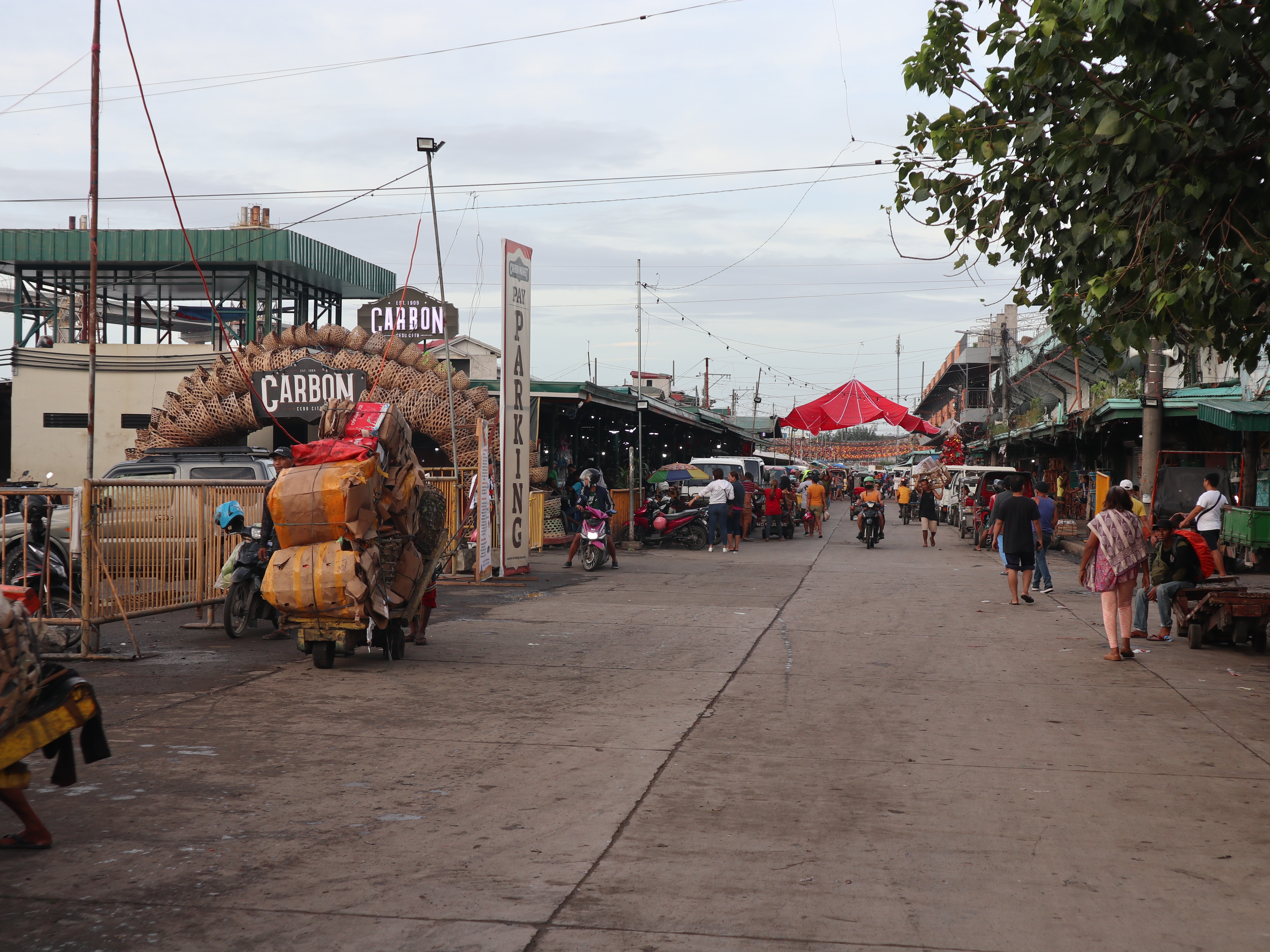
- Location: M.C. Briones Avenue, Ermita; Cebu City, Philippines; 10.29142°N 123.8991°E
- Developer: Cebu2World Development Inc. (since 2020)
- Management: Cebu City Market Authority
- Owner: Cebu City Government
- Number of tenants: ~6,000
- Total retail floor area: 15,000 m^{2} (160,000 sq ft)
- Website: www.carbonmarketcebu.com
- Interactive map of Carbon Market

The Carbon Market is the largest market in Cebu City, Philippines. It is the oldest market in the Central Visayas region. As the largest market in the city, various wares are sold in Carbon, including dry goods such as clothing, kitchenware, and handicrafts, as well as wet goods, such as fruits, vegetables, and meat, among other goods, sold by approximately 6,000 vendors in the market.

In the 2020s, the market started undergoing redevelopment works aimed at modernizing the market. These works include the construction of a new main building for the market, as well as other retail amenities aside from the market. The first of the three new public market buildings is scheduled to be finished by December 2026.

== Etymology ==
The name of the Carbon Market came from the word carbón, Spanish for coal, since the area was said to be close to a coal depot used for the steam-powered ships and trains of the old Cebu Railway that ran in Cebu from the 19th century up until World War II.

== History ==
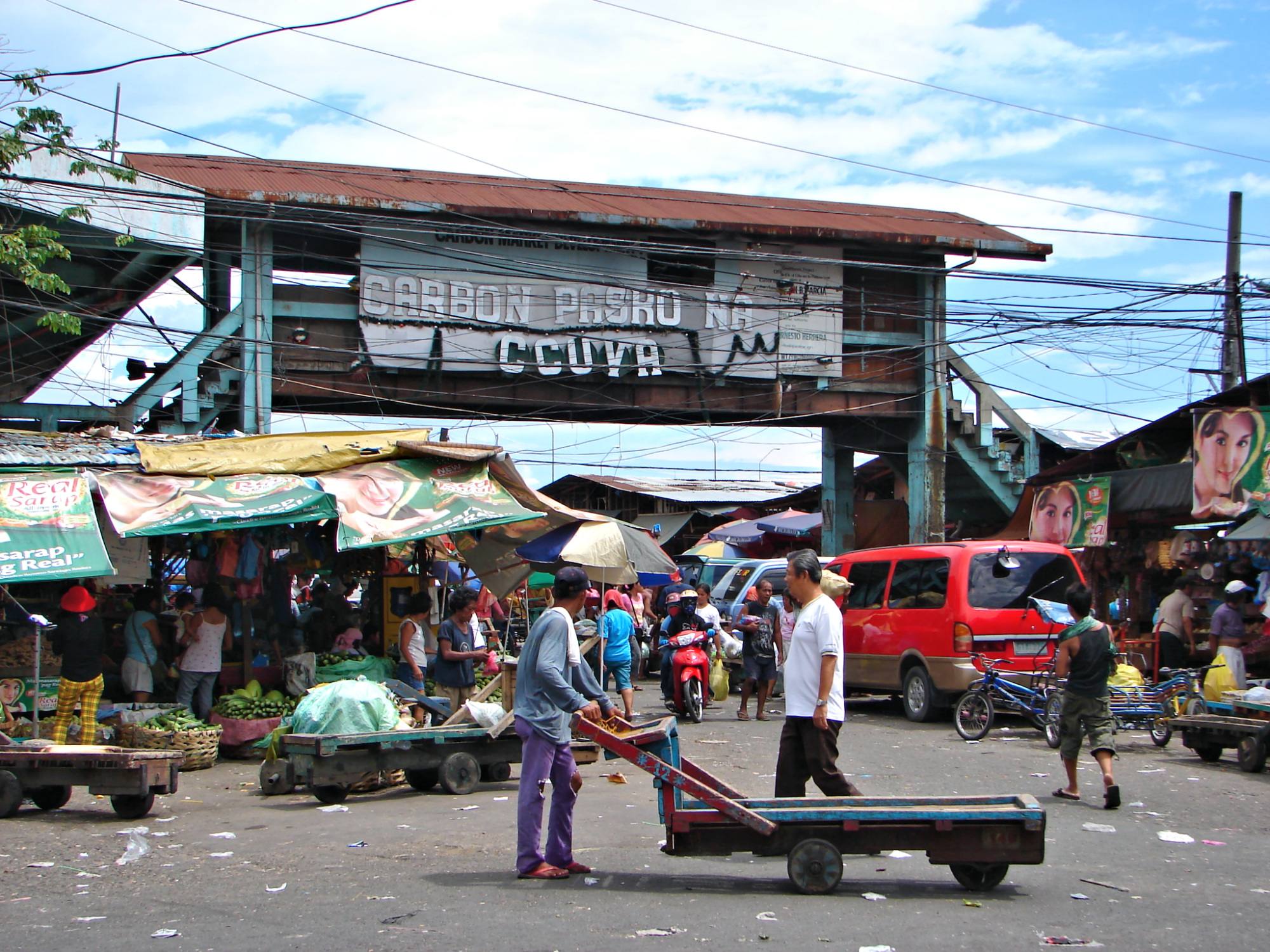
Carbon Market entrance in downtown Cebu City. 2009

Little is known as to when commercial activities in Carbon started. However, the district around Carbon, called Lutao ("float" in English), which also includes the Ermita barangay, is right by the coast and close to the port of Cebu. It is said that trade was already present during the Spanish occupation of Cebu, and Carbon Market predates the American occupation of the Philippines.

Like much of Cebu and the Philippines, Carbon sustained heavy damages from World War II. But as the city and the country rebuilt and grew, so did the market. On May 13, 1964, then-Philippine president Diosdado Macapagal, by the virtue of the Presidential Proclamation 241, formally donated the plot of land on which Carbon stood to the local government of Cebu City, which, until then, was formally owned by the national government.

In the 1990s, there were plans to phase out the Carbon Market leading to the formation of cooperatives by vendors. In 2000, some vendors created a cooperative to sell their wares, and later two other cooperatives were formed by different units of the market.

In 2007, governmental delays in rebuilding of the market caused a political controversy, leading one vendor to run for city council from the barangay of Ermita, winning on that single-issue platform.

As of September 2009, the Cebu City government opened up land for private development of a newer market, called the Bagsakan Center. The goal was to increase competition and lower prices for consumers at both markets.

In the late 2010s, there was a proposal by retail firm SM Prime to redevelop the Carbon Market.

In 2020, Filipino conglomerate Megawide Construction Corporation entered into a 50-year agreement with the local government of Cebu City that would see the redevelopment of the market to include other lifestyle and mixed-use developments within the market, as well as a transport hub which includes a water taxi that would connect to Mactan–Cebu International Airport.

== Redevelopment ==
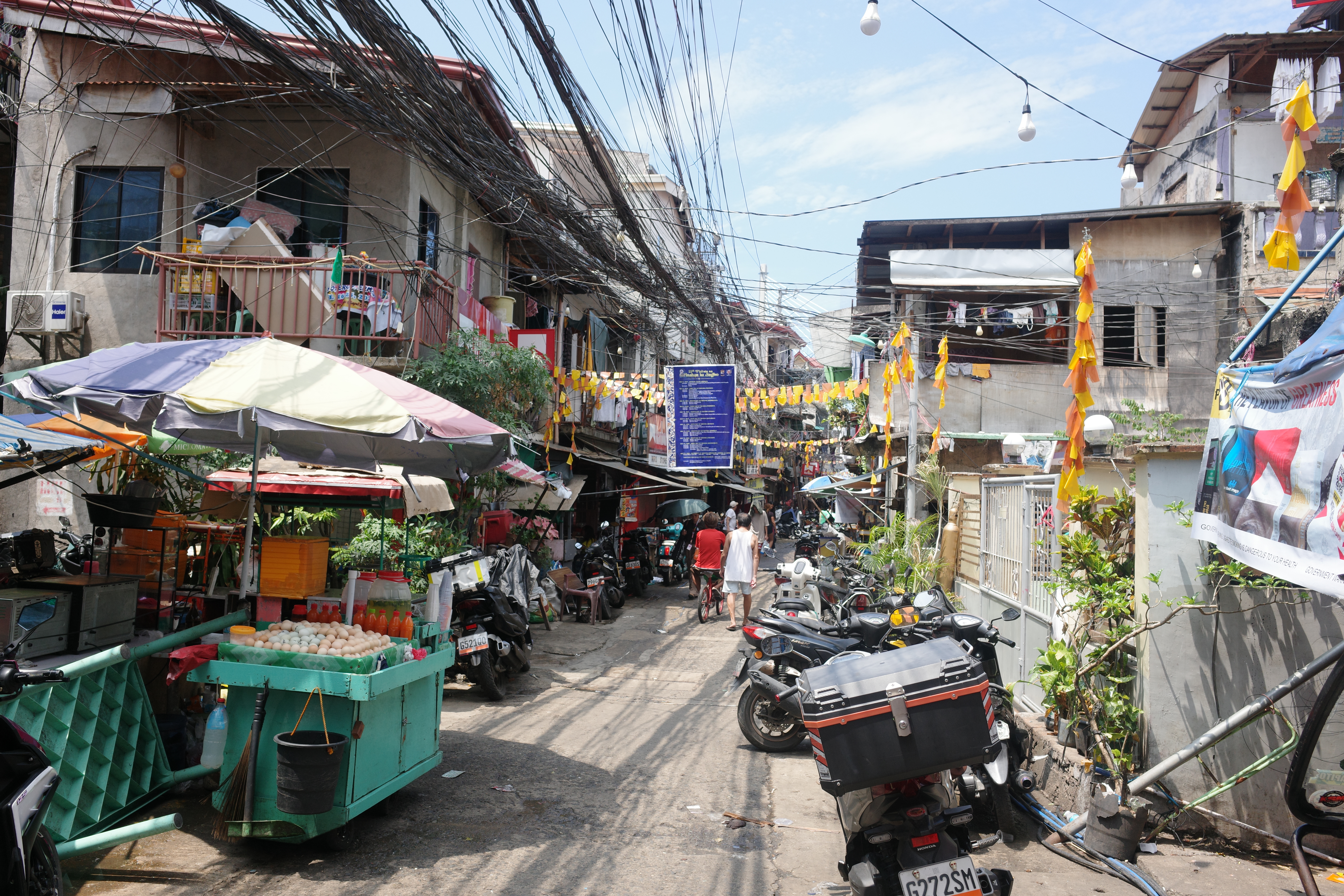
F. Calderon Street, one of the downtown streets absorbed into Carbon's street trade

In January 2020, the Cebu City government and Megawide Construction Corporation signed a 50-year joint venture agreement (JVA) for the redevelopment of the Carbon Public Market, a contract originally valued at about ₱5.5 billion; a supplemental agreement in July 2022 raised the project's value to about ₱8 billion. The work is carried out by Megawide's subsidiary Cebu2World Development Inc. (C2W) in phases, and is intended to modernize the market while retaining its role in Cebuano daily life. Early components completed under the redevelopment include the restoration of Freedom Park in October 2022, the Sto. Niño Chapel, an interim market building, and The Barracks hawker center.

As of 2026, the developer targeted completion of the main public market building by December 2026, with the ₱1.1-billion mixed-use "Block 2" structure slated for the first quarter of 2026.

=== Masterplan ===
The Carbon Redevelopment project includes the restoration of Freedom Park (formerly Plaza Washington / Plaza Recoletos), beautification of Senior Citizens' Park, construction of parking infrastructure, and the building of three public market structures. The market buildings are designed to house public market vendors on the upper and lower grounds, with commercial spaces on the higher floors. The first of the three buildings is expected to be finished by December 2026.

Under the arrangement, it is the duty of the Cebu City Government, through the Office of the City Markets, to decide and finalize the list of regular and ambulant vendors who occupy the public market stalls. Only the city government can set the rates for the public market vendors, as provided by the Market Code, while Cebu2World may set rates for the commercial areas intended for entrepreneurs who are not on the city's list. The city government collects fees from public market vendors, while Cebu2World collects only from commercial tenants.

=== Vendor displacement and disputes ===
Demolition of older stalls began in July 2022, and the project drew opposition from vendors and cooperatives who feared displacement and higher rents; a local vendors' alliance estimated that the redevelopment could affect thousands of vendors. Reporting in 2026 described the market as having roughly 1,000 regular stallholders and about 4,000 ambulant vendors, with base rents in the public market rising from ₱16 per square meter in 2021 to ₱28 in 2024 under the agreement's schedule. Cebu2World has disputed claims that the project would privatize the market or sharply raise costs, saying rents follow the 2017 Market Code and would remain ₱8.50 per square meter in the new main building until 2028.

In 2023, the city implemented a "pedestrianized Carbon market" scheme that barred vehicles from M.C. Briones, F. Calderon, and Manalili streets between 6 p.m. and 6 a.m. Ambulant vendors protested the scheme outside Cebu City Hall in June 2023, saying it hurt their sales, and a petition to reverse it gathered hundreds of signatures.

The agreement faced further scrutiny in 2026. Vice Mayor Tomas Osmeña petitioned the Supreme Court in January 2026 seeking to halt construction, Mayor Nestor Archival froze the collection of market fees in February 2026, and in April 2026 the Cebu City Council moved to create a panel to review the joint venture agreement over concerns about vendor welfare, fees, and the city's liabilities.

== Vendors and street trade ==
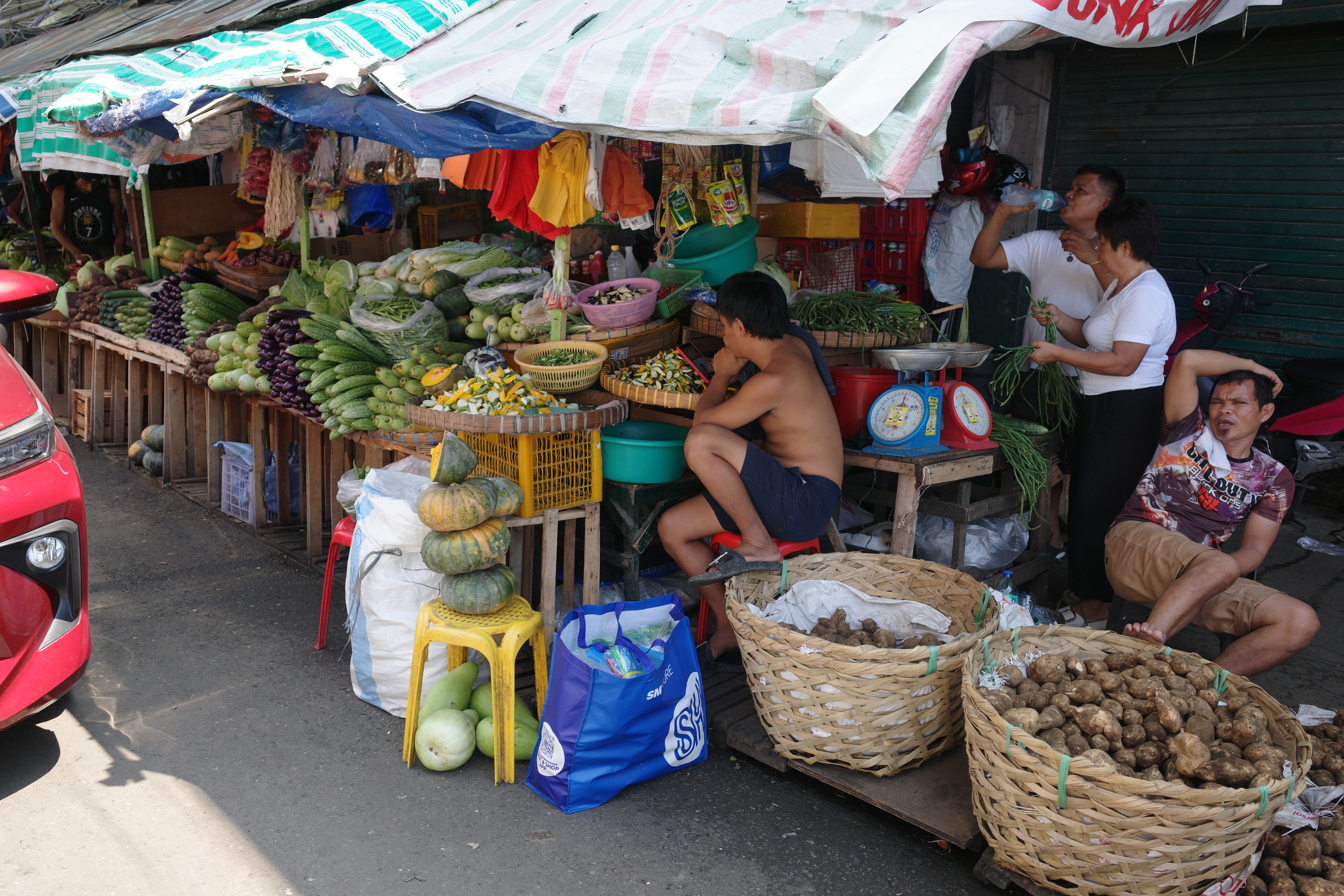
Street vendors and produce in the Carbon Market

As the largest public market in Cebu City, Carbon draws thousands of vendors selling both wet and dry goods. Beyond the three main market units, ambulant (roving) vendors trade along the surrounding downtown streets, including F. Calderon, Manalili, Plaridel, F. Gonzales, and Lincoln streets, which form part of the wider market district.

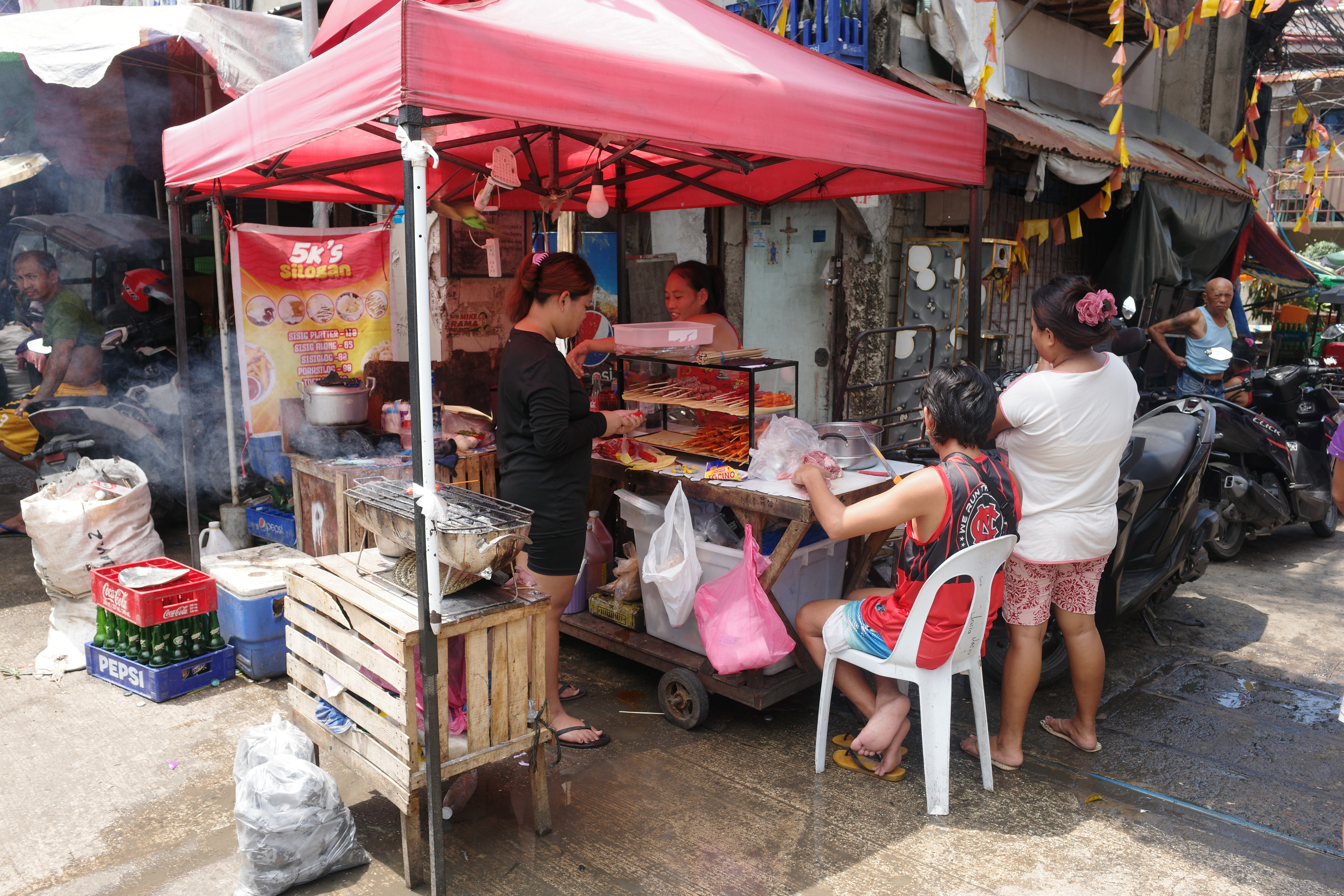
Street food vendors near the Carbon Market

Cooked-food and street-food stalls operate around the market alongside the produce and dry-goods sellers, and the market district extends into the residential sitios of Barangay Ermita near the coast.

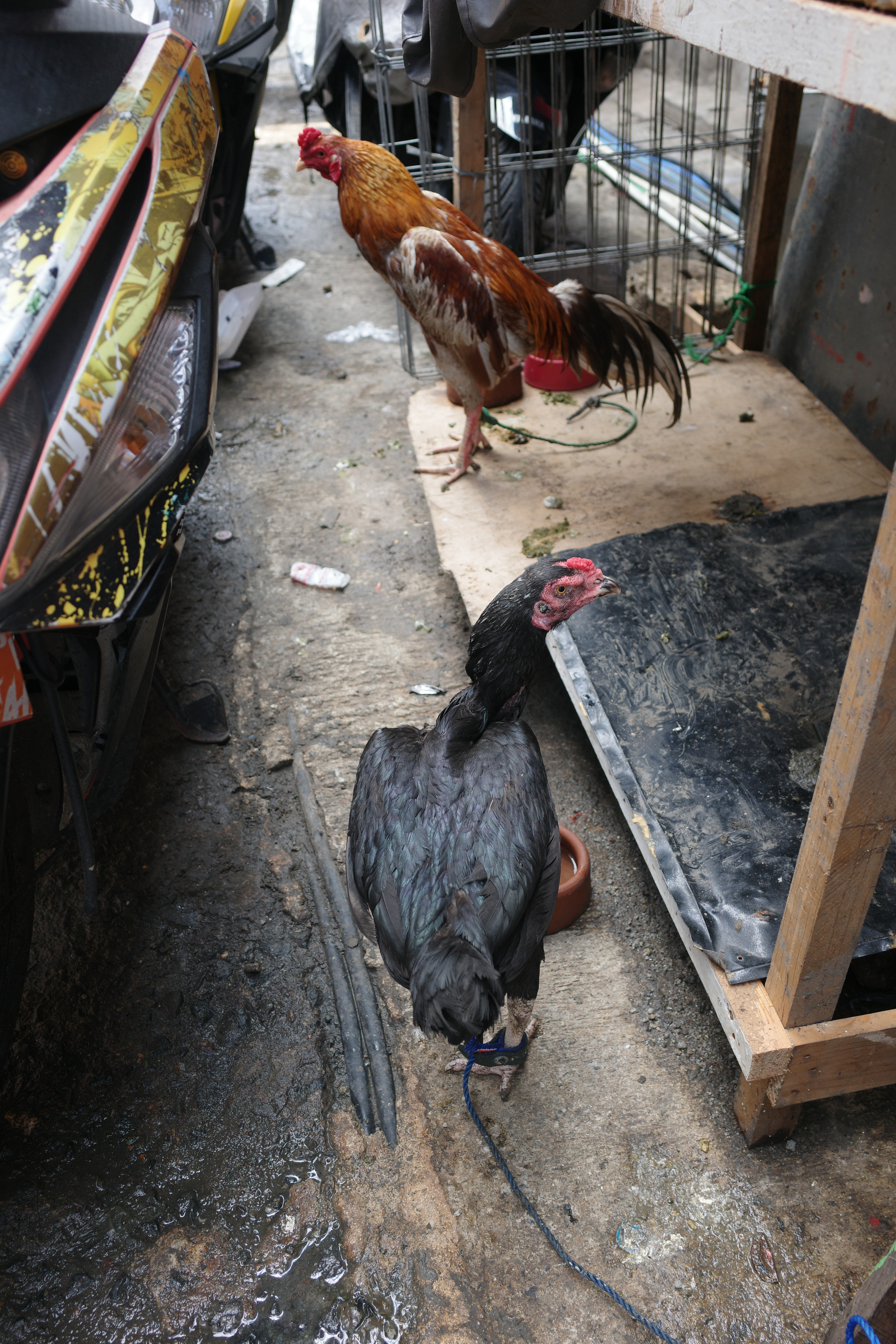
Vendors selling livestock along F. Calderon Street

=== Carbon Night Market ===
In 2022, the developer Cebu2World launched a weekend night market at Carbon as part of the redevelopment, initially held on Sundays before expanding to a Friday-to-Sunday schedule featuring Cebuano street food and other stalls. In 2024, the Cebu City government separately relocated about 1,000 ambulant vendors, who had previously sold overnight along F. Gonzales, Plaridel, Manalili, and Magallanes streets, to a designated night market on a portion of M.C. Briones Street, in an effort to ease traffic and clear the market's entryways.

== Facilities ==
=== Units ===
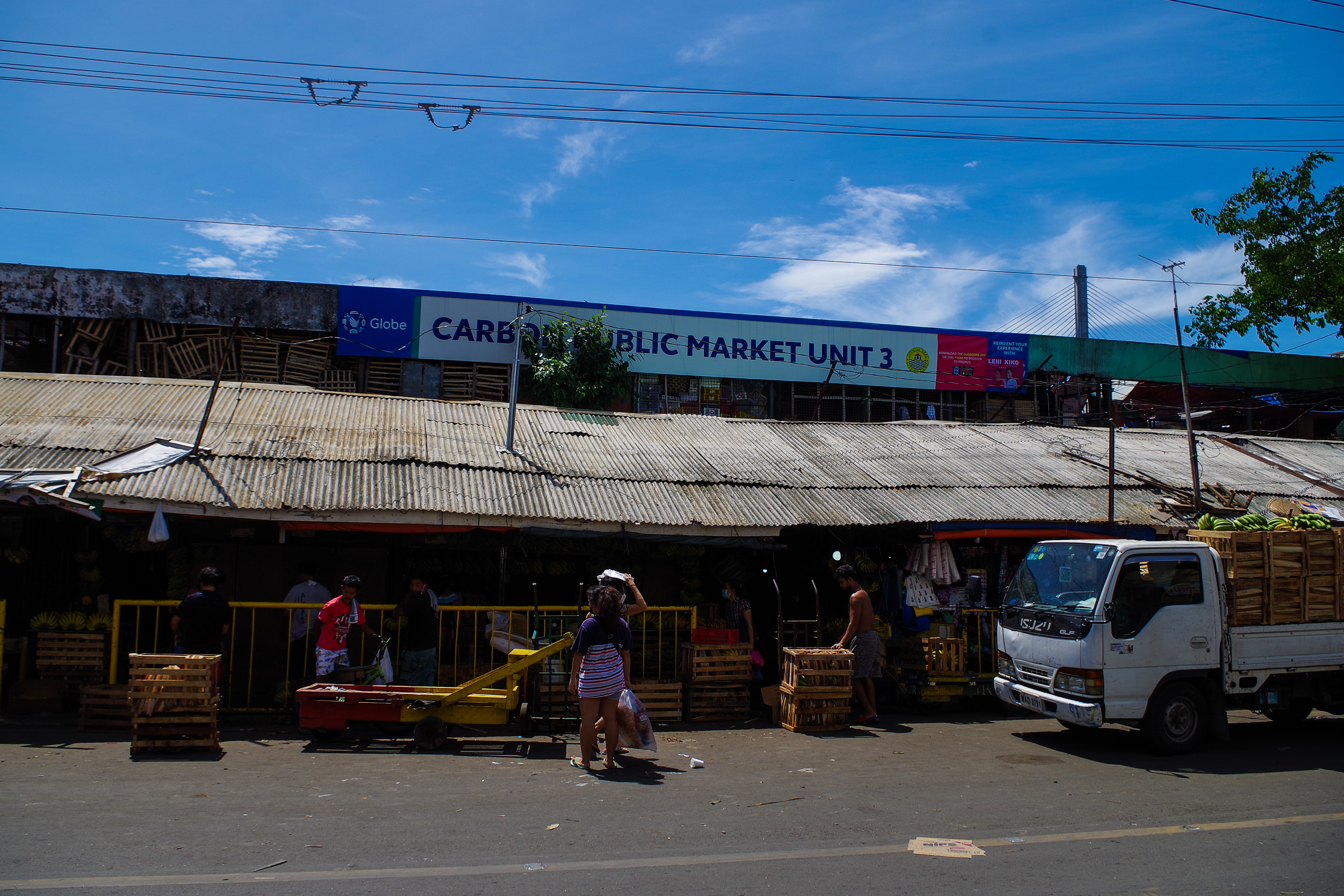
Carbon Market - Unit 3

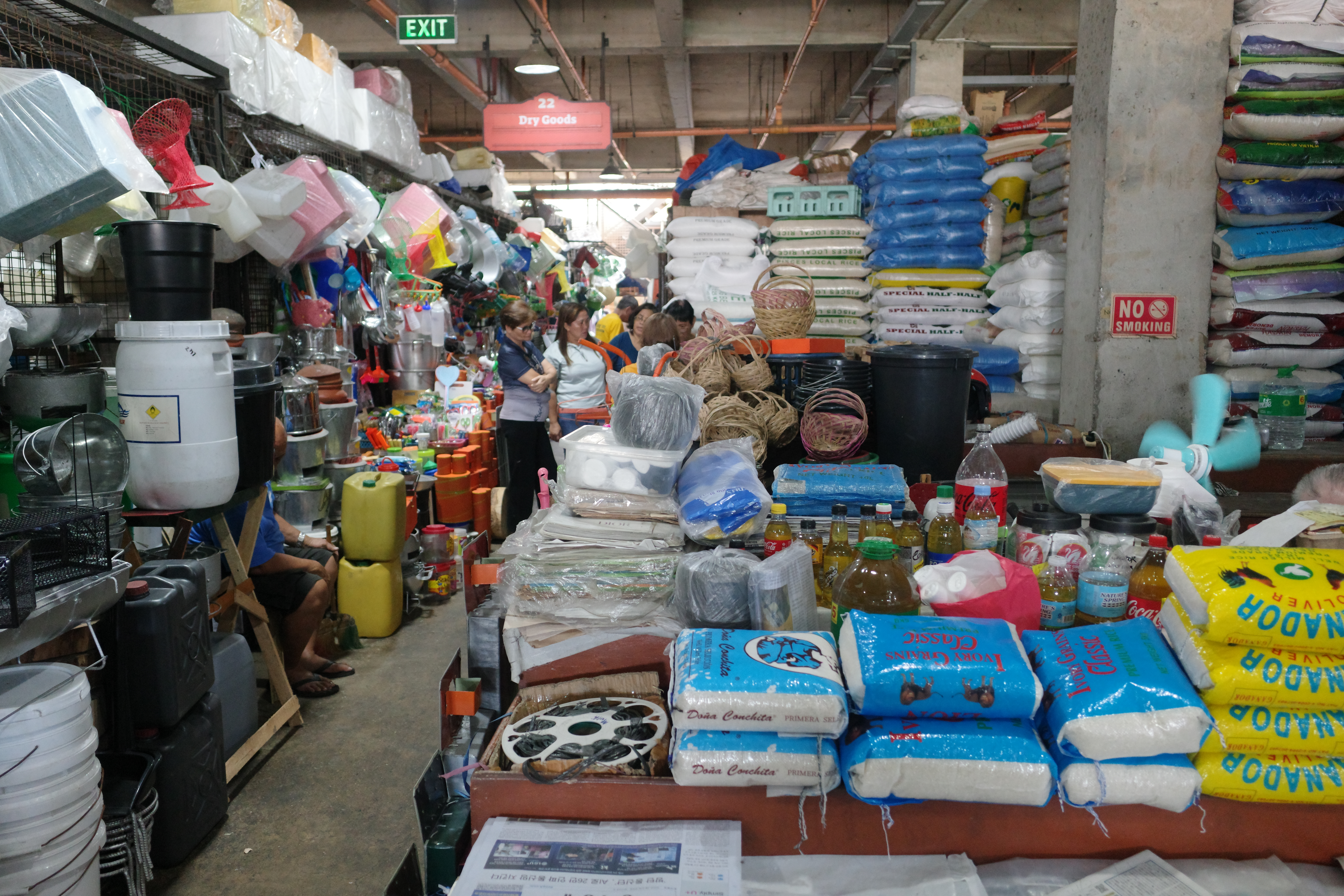
Dry goods section inside a main Carbon Market building

The market is housed in three structures namely Unit 1, Unit 2, and Unit 3, along the M.C. Briones St. in Barangay Ermita:

- Unit 1 – Wet market selling meat and seafood
- Unit 2 – Destroyed by a fire in 1998, reopened in 2022 as an interim (temporary) market.
- Unit 3 – Fruits area. Second floor razed by fire in 2018.

=== Others ===
Freedom Park

- Freedom Park – named as Plaza Washington during the American era and Plaza Recoletos in the Spanish colonial era, it was eventually renamed by then-Cebu governor Sergio Osmeña Jr. in 1951 to its current name. The name reflects it as a place where Cebuanos could freely exercise their freedoms and was the site of religious gatherings, and debates, among other activities. The plot of land was originally owned by the Order of Augustinian Recollects (which run the University of San Jose–Recoletos across Freedom Park) to the Cebu City government, under the condition "that it be made as a park where people can exercise their constitutional right to free speech and to remain as such". In the 1960s it was gradually integrated into the market, starting out with a few stalls, until the original park eventually vanished. Since the 1960s until the 2020s redevelopment, Freedom Park was known for its flower shops. With the redevelopment, the flower shops and other stalls in Freedom Park were demolished and repurposed back to its original intended use as a public park, along with a 15-meter tall obelisk as a new symbol for the park.

"The Barracks" temporary facility while Puso Village was constructed.

- Warwick Barracks – located behind the Freedom Park, it was originally the called the "Post of Cebu", set up by the Americans in 1899 during their occupation of Cebu. In 1904, the name was changed into "Camp Warwick" to honor Captain Oliver Warwick who had been killed fighting Filipinos in Passi, Iloilo in 1899. A year later in 1905, it was renamed to its current name, the Warwick Barracks. After the Americans left, the Warwick Barracks were vacated and was gradually integrated into Carbon, and had also been used as a car park. After the redevelopment, Warwick Barracks will be repurposed as a retail area, and will be the location of the new Carbon Market main building until 2022
- Senior Citizens' Park Chapel – a Roman Catholic chapel which is topped by a statue of the Santo Niño de Cebú which was the first building constructed by Megawide as tribute to the Holy Child.
- Pusô Village – named and designed after the pusô, a Filipino way of cooking rice wrapped in coconut palm fronds, this food hub houses commercial food and retail stalls not available in the public market. It is located on the edge of Carbon beside the Compañía Marítima Building along the Cebu South Coastal Road.
