= Florentino Solon =

Filipino nutritionist and politician (1931–2020)

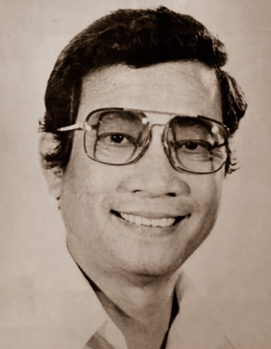

Mayor of Cebu City
- In office October 16, 1978 – 1983
- Vice Mayor: Eulogio Borres (1978–1980); Ronald Duterte (1980–1983)
- Preceded by: Eulogio Borres
- Succeeded by: Ronald Duterte

Executive Director of the National Nutrition Council
- In office July 16, 1974 – December 31, 1979
- President: Ferdinand Marcos
- Preceded by: Position established
- Succeeded by: Delfina Aguillon

Deputy Minister of Health
- In office 1983–1986
- President: Ferdinand Marcos
- Minister: Jesus Azurin

Personal details
- Born: Florentino Sanico Solon; September 17, 1931 Cebu City, Cebu, Philippines
- Died: June 17, 2020 (aged 88) Cebu City, Cebu, Philippines
- Party: Kilusang Bagong Lipunan
- Spouse: Mercedes Aseniero Solon
- Profession: Nutritionist, Politician

Florentino Sanico Solon (September 17, 1931 – June 17, 2020) was a Filipino nutritionist and politician who served as the mayor of Cebu City from 1978 to 1983. He served as the first executive director of the Nutrition Center of the Philippines in 1974 and as Deputy Minister of Health from 1983 to 1986 during the presidency of Ferdinand Marcos.

== Early life and education ==
Solon was born to Pio Palacio Solon and Ricarda Sanico Solon. He earned a master's degree in public health at University of the Philippines Manila and a doctor of medicine at University of Santo Tomas. He also obtained a diploma in nutrition from the London School of Hygiene & Tropical Medicine.

== Early career ==
Solon started as a municipal health officer in Carmen, Cebu and later on worked for the regional office of the Ministry of Health while being a lecturer at Cebu Institute of Medicine. He became the first executive director of the National Nutrition Council (NNC) on July 16, 1974 and founding director of the Nutrition Center of the Philippines in 1974. He served in the NNC until December 31, 1979 and was succeeded by Delfina Aguillon.

== Political career ==
Appointed as mayor of Cebu City, Solon was sworn in by then President Ferdinand Marcos on October 11, 1978 and assumed the position on October 16, 1978. Solon then took part in the 1980 elections where he was eventually elected as mayor along with Ronald Duterte as his vice mayor.

During Solon's stint as mayor, the Sinulog Festival was realized after David S. Odilao Jr., then regional director of the Ministry of Sports and Youth Development, organized the first Sinulog parade involving several schools and eventually turned over the organizing of such to the Cebu City Historical Committee under Jesus B. Garcia Jr.

In 1983, Solon was tapped by Marcos to serve as the deputy minister for health.

== Personal life ==
Solon was married to Mercedes Aseniero. His son, Juan Antonio Aseniero Solon, is the current president of the Nutrition Center of the Philippines.

== Death ==
Solon died at the age of 88 on June 17, 2020.

== Selected publications ==
- Solon, Florentino (January 1, 1997). "Developing a National Training Pyramid". Food and Nutrition Bulletin. 18 (2): 1–4. doi:10.1177/156482659701800214.
- Solon, Florentino (June 1, 1998). "History of Fortification of Margarine with Vitamin A in the Philippines". Food and Nutrition Bulletin. 19 (2): 154–157. doi:10.1177/156482659801900210.
- Solon, Florentino (January 1, 2000). "Food Fortification in the Philippines: Policies, Programmes, Issues, and Prospects". Food and Nutrition Bulletin. 21 (4): 515–520. doi:10.1177/156482650002100433.
- Solon, Florentino; Sanchez-Fermin, Liza; Wambangco, Lorena (January 1, 2000). "Strengths and Weaknesses of the Food Fortification Programme for the Elimination of Vitamin A Deficiency in the Philippines". Food and Nutrition Bulletin. 21 (2): 239–246. doi:10.1177/156482650002100220.
- Solon, Florentino; Sarol, Jesus Jr.; Bernardo, Allan; Solon, Juan Antonio; Mehansho, Haile; Sanchez-Fermin, Liza; Wambangco, Lorena; Juhlin, Kenton (January 1, 2003). "Effect of a Multiple-Micronutrient-Fortified Fruit Powder Beverage on the Nutrition Status, Physical Fitness, and Cognitive Performance of Schoolchildren in the Philippines". Food and Nutrition Bulletin. 24 (4_suppl_1): S129–S140. doi:10.1177/15648265030244S110. PMID 17016955.
- Solon, Florentino; Sarol, Jesus Jr.; Bernardo, Allan; Solon, Juan Antonio; Mehansho, Haile; Sanchez-Fermin, Liza; Wambangco, Lorena; Juhlin, Kenton (October 1, 2003). "Effect of a Multiple-Micronutrient-Fortified Fruit Powder Beverage on the Nutrition Status, Physical Fitness, and Cognitive Performance of Schoolchildren in the Philippines". Food and Nutrition Bulletin. 24 (4_suppl2): S129–S140. doi:10.1177/15648265030244S210. PMID 17016955.
- Solon, Florentino (December 1, 2006). "Good Governance for Nutrition in the Philippines: Elements, Experiences, and Lessons Learned". Food and Nutrition Bulletin. 27 (4): 343–352. doi:10.1177/156482650602700409. PMID 17209477.
- Maramag, Cherry; Tengco, Lorena; Rayco-Solon, Pura; Solon, Juan Antonio; Maglalang, Hector; Solon, Florentino (December 1, 2007). "Stability of Iodine in Iodized Fresh and Aged Salt Exposed to Simulated Market Conditions". Food and Nutrition Bulletin. 28 (4): 412–418. doi:10.1177/156482650702800406. PMID 18274168.

Political offices
Preceded by Eulogio Borres	Mayor of Cebu City; 1978–1983	Succeeded by Ronald Duterte
