= Compañía Marítima Building =

Pre-war neoclassical heritage building located in Cebu City port area, Philippines

- South-side view of the Compañía Marítima Building

- Location within Metro Cebu Location within Visayas
- Former names: Fernandez Building; Shamrock Hotel

General information
- Architectural style: Neoclassical architecture
- Location: Cebu City, Quezon Boulevard and Cebu South Coastal Road, Cebu City, Philippines
- Coordinates: 10°17′29.5″N 123°54′8.2″E
- Owner: Disputed between Cebu City Government and Cebu Port Authority

The Compañía Marítima Building also known as the Marítima Ruins is a neoclassical heritage building located in Cebu City, Philippines that was built in 1910. It was one of the first buildings constructed in the city's port area, and was known by different names throughout its history: Fernando Building and Shamrock Hotel before the war, and currently, the Compañía Marítima de Cebú.

== Location ==
The Compañía Marítima is a three-story building located at the waterfront area in the old district of Cebu City near the east coast of the South Road Properties (SRP). It is situated on a 42,000-square-meter lot on Quezon Boulevard between P. Burgos and Lapu-lapu Streets and accessible from the Cebu City Hall and Carbon Market.

== Design ==
Its architectural style is characterized as neoclassical, which was typical of structures constructed during the American colonization, that featured prominent arched windows, classical pilasters, "ornamental beams, and sculptured railings on its roof decks." Architect Karl Cabilao wrote, "Its façade is at times reminiscent of beautiful Renaissance palazzos of Europe."

== History ==
=== Fernandez Building ===
The structure was built in 1910 on a reclaimed land where the then new port of Cebu was established. Popularly known during that time as the Fernandez Building, it was one of the first buildings constructed in the port area. The company Fernandez Hermanos Inc., which was founded by brothers Jose and Ramon Fernandez, owned it but it was uncertain who the first occupants were.

=== Shamrock Hotel ===
It is not clear too when the Manila Steamship Company's offices occupied the building's first floor and the Shamrock Hotel on the upper floors. However, according to the author Lucy Urgello Miller, the hotel – whose proprietor was Mike Ryan as shown on the 1937 advertising postcard – occupied the entire building by the 1930s. Because of its close proximity to the port, patrons could disembark from the shipping vessels and cross the street to check in for accommodation.

=== Compañía Marítima ===
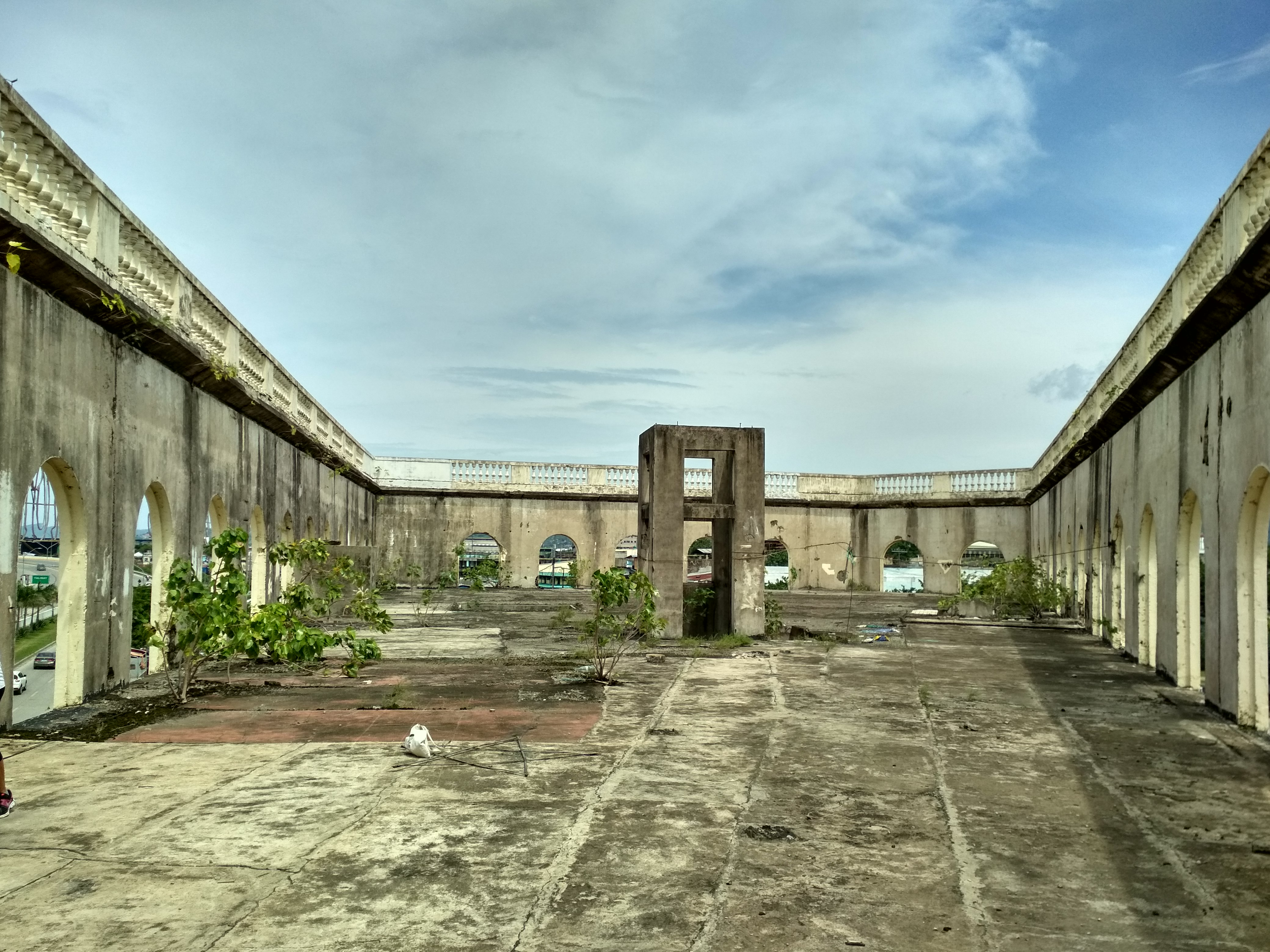
Compañía Marítima upper floor

Despite the damages from bombings in World War II, the building survived. After repairs were made in the post-war era, it became the location of the Compañía Marítima de Cebú, one of the successful pre-war transportation companies established in 1886 and the biggest shipping firm in the Philippines whose vessels navigated around western and southern Mindanao ports. When the business filed for bankruptcy in 1980, the building was abandoned.

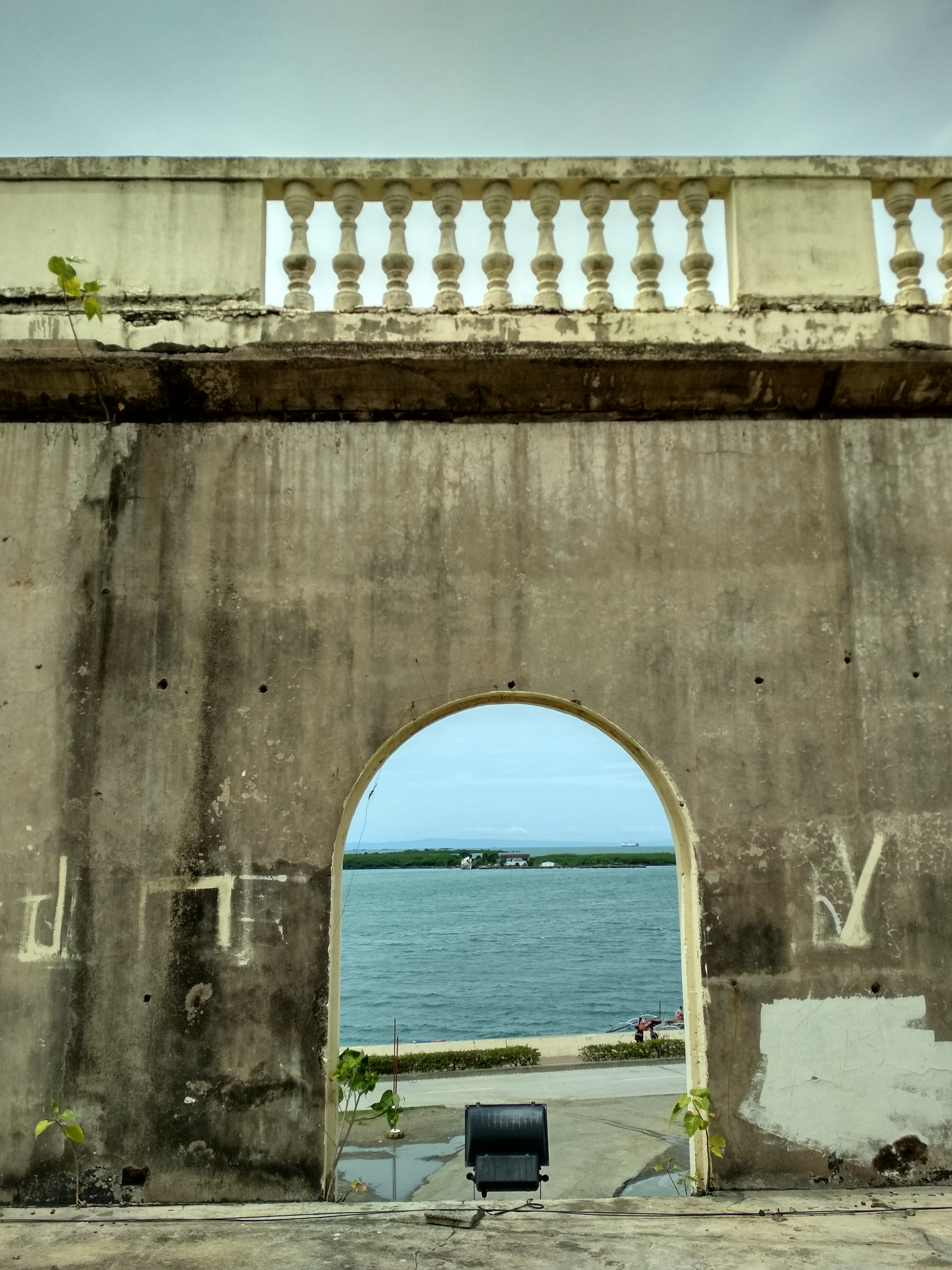
Waterfront wall and view of the sea from the Compañía Marítima Building.

It presently is in a state of disrepair, roofless, and missing interior walls. Its company name used to be visible on its waterfront wall, and its roofs were destroyed by Typhoon Ruping in 1992. On October 26, 2013, the city's Department of Engineering and Public Works declared it "off-limits" because of the structural damage it sustained during the earthquake that occurred on October 15.

== Devotee City ==
The property surrounding the building was designated as parking lot in 2015. It has also served as Devotee City, a temporary holding area to host pilgrims from neighboring towns and provinces who had no place to stay during the Sinulog festivities every January since 2016.

== Property ownership ==
North-side view

The land on which the building stands is the subject of an ownership dispute between the Cebu Port Authority (CPA) and the Cebu City government. The port area near the Compañía Marítima was reclaimed to construct the viaduct that connected to the tunnel from SRP to McArthur Boulevard, and the resulting reclaimed lot was given by the Department of Public Works and Highways to the CPA through a memorandum of agreement. CPA's legal officer Yusop Uckung claimed that a land title as proof of ownership was not necessary as the government owned "foreshore areas."

On July 4, 2013, during the term of Michael Rama, the city government issued a tax declaration as evidence of its possession of the property. A case to stop the city government from ownership was filed by CPA representing the national government through the Office of the Solicitor General on July 7, 2015, and Regional Trial Court Judge Soliver Peras denied the plea on November 16, 2015, stating that the area no longer served as a shipping dock. In January, 2016, CPA asked the Court of Appeals to overturn the local court's ruling.

On May 28, 2024, Cebu Port Authority's General Manager Francisco Comendador III and the Cebu City government signed a compromise agreement on the waterfront development projects - Compañía, Carbon Market Redevelopment Project’s Pusó Village, and the mechanical parking area. Acting Mayor Raymond Alvin Garcia in a press conference said the document will be submitted to the court trying the case for Resolution.
