= Senior Citizens' Park Chapel =

Roman Catholic church in Cebu City, Philippines

- The chapel and park as seen from above, in 2022

Religion
- Affiliation: Roman Catholic
- Patron: Santo Niño de Cebú
- Year consecrated: 2022
- Status: Chapel

Location
- Location: Senior Citizens' Park, Carbon Market, Cebu City
- Country: Philippines
- Interactive map of Senior Citizens' Park Chapel
- Administration: Archdiocese of Cebu
- Coordinates: 10°17′32″N 123°54′06″E

Architecture
- General contractor: Cebu2World
- Groundbreaking: 2021
- Completed: 2022

Specifications
- Capacity: 150
- Interior area: 300 m^{2} (3,200 sq ft)
- Site area: 3,704 m^{2} (39,870 sq ft)
- Monument: 1

The Senior Citizens' Park Chapel (Señor Santo Niño Chapel), also known simply as the Santo Niño Chapel, is Roman Catholic chapel at the Senior Citizens' Park in Cebu City, Philippines.

== Background ==
The whole Senior Citizens' Park covers an area of 3,704 square meters (39,870 sq ft). It has a chapel, known as the Senior Citizens' Park Chapel (also known as the Señor Santo Niño Chapel or the Santo Niño Chapel), as its main feature. The chapel opened on April 17, 2022, on Easter Sunday. It was blessed by Cebu Archbishop José S. Palma on the same day.

The chapel itself covers an area of 300 square meters (3,200 sq ft) and can accommodate 150 worshippers. The facade was inspired from the Santo Niño image's crown and the wavy structure of Terminal 2 of Mactan–Cebu International Airport (MCIA).

The religious facility is topped by a 9.14 m (30.0 ft) tall statue of the Santo Niño (Child Jesus), which is a bigger and close replica of the image displayed at the MCIA.

The chapel as seen at ground level, in 2026

The construction of the Santo Niño Chapel is part of a bigger Carbon District modernization project by the Cebu City government and private firm Megawide. The structure was developed by Megawide subsidiary Cebu2World (C2W). Construction began in mid-2021, and the entire Santo Niño sculpture was transported for assembly from Manila to Cebu City on December 14, 2021. Installation of the sculpture was intended to take place prior to the New Year's Day of 2022 but was delayed due to the onslaught of Typhoon Rai (Odette) two days after the arrival of the statue in Cebu. The statue would be installed by February 2022.
