= Sinulog =

Annual Filipino cultural and religious festival

Sinulog Festival
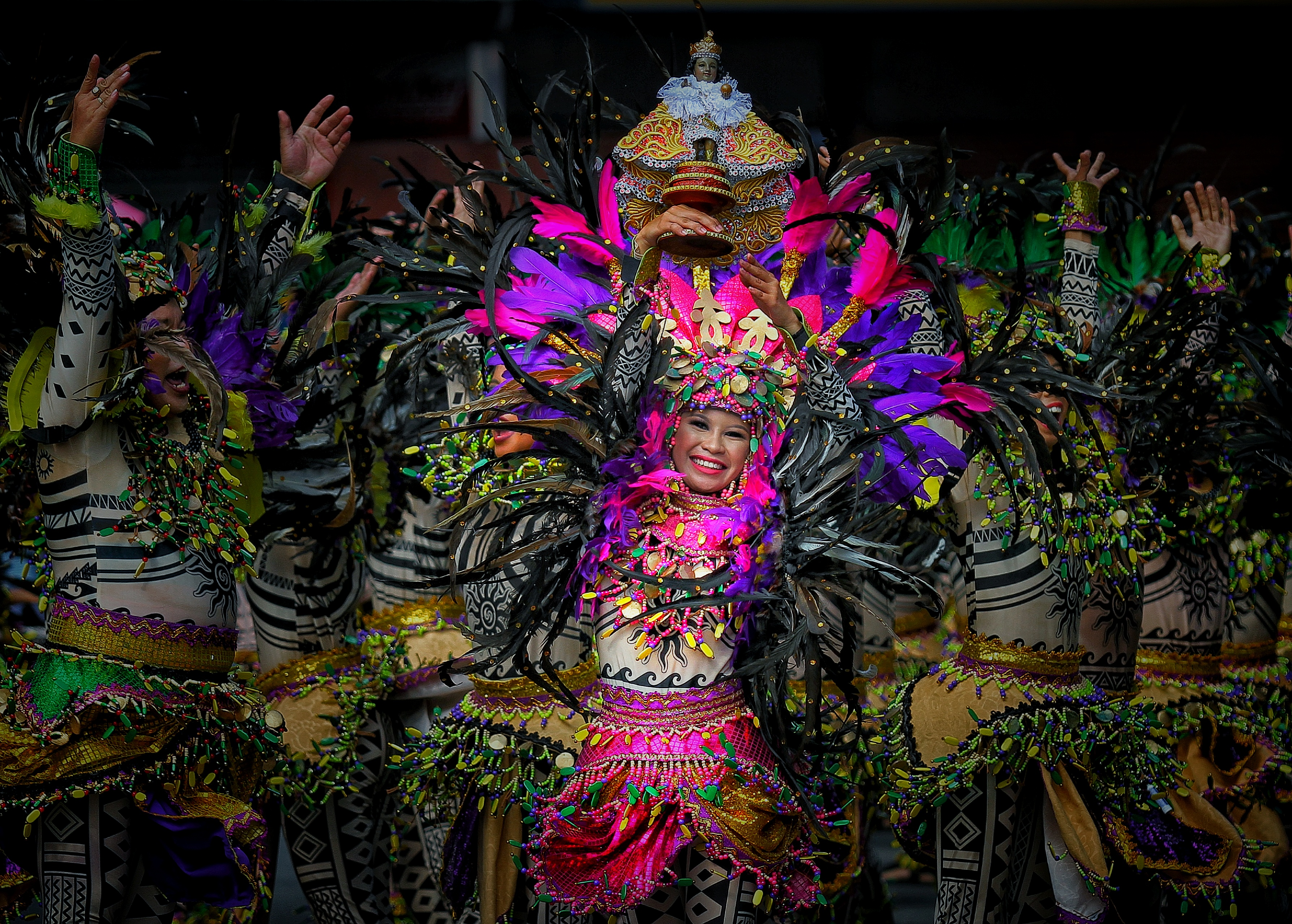
- A Sinulog festival queen carries the Holy Child Jesus, locally known as Santo Niño
- Official name: Sinulog Festival
- Also called: Sinulog
- Observed by: Cebu
- Type: Religious/cultural
- Significance: In honor of the Holy Child and the Christianization of the Filipino people
- Celebrations: Parades; street dancing; river and street processions; novena masses; parties
- Date: Third Sunday in January
- 2025 date: January 19
- 2026 date: January 18
- 2027 date: January 17
- 2028 date: January 16
- Frequency: Annual
- First time: January 20, 1980; 46 years ago
- Related to: Feast of Santo Niño; Dinagyang; Ati-Atihan

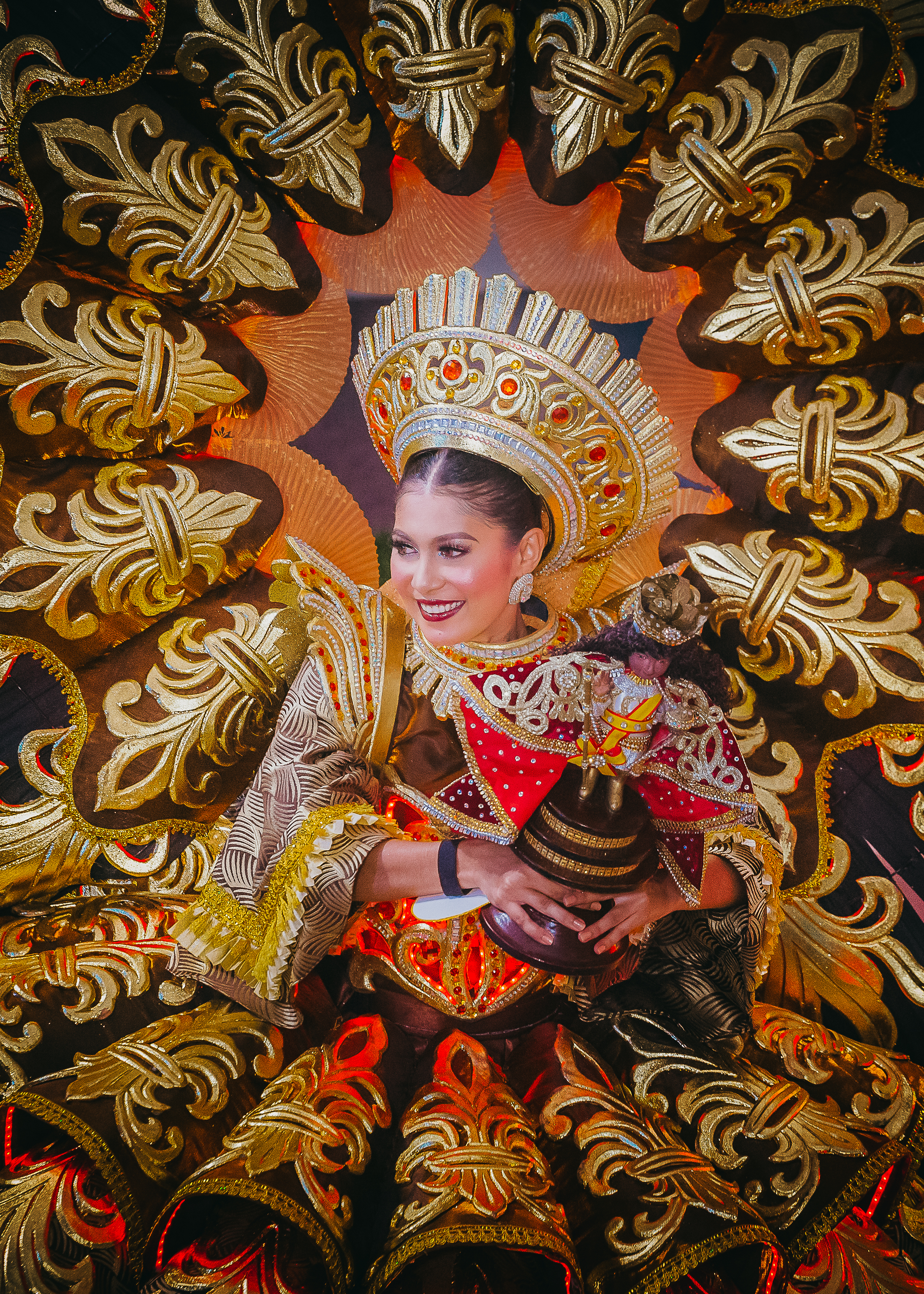
A Sinulog Festival Queen carrying the image of Santo Niño, representing Toledo City, in 2023.

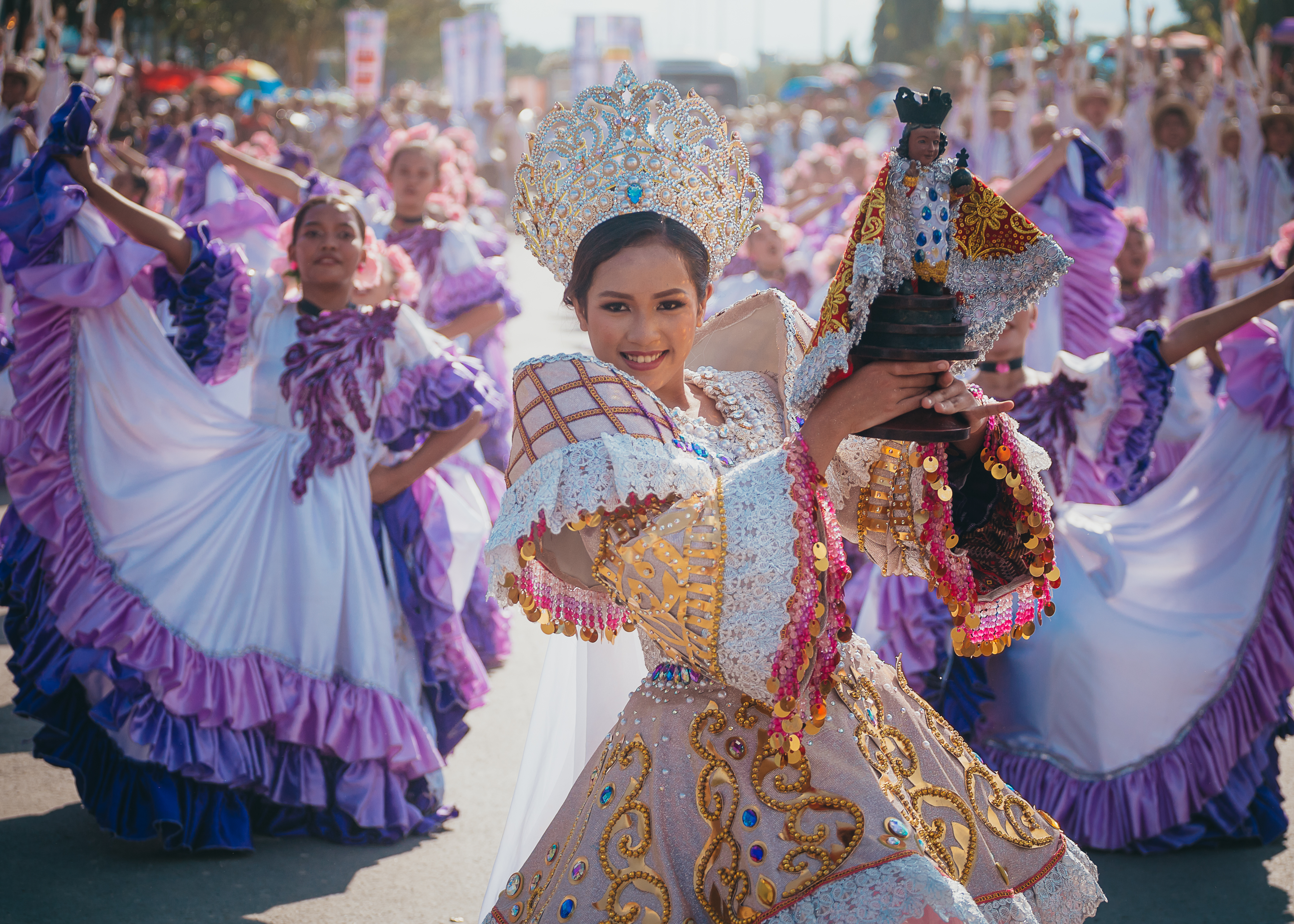
Street dancers performing at South Road Properties

The Sinulog Festival (also known as Sinug and Sulog) is an annual Filipino cultural and religious festival held on the third Sunday of January in Cebu province, with the center of the activities being in Cebu City; and is the core of Santo Niño Christian celebrations in the country.

The festival is widely regarded as one of the largest cultural and religious celebrations in the Philippines, with the 2026 event attracting over 5.2 million attendees. Aside from the religious aspect of the festival, Sinulog is also famous for its street parties, usually happening the night before and on the night of the main festival. The event is sometimes referred to as the "Grandest Festival in the Philippines" by participants and locals.

Other places in the Philippines also celebrate their own version of the festival in honor of the Santo Niño, both within the province of Cebu, such as Carmen, and outside, including Tondo, Kabankalan, General Santos, Maasin, Cagayan de Oro, Butuan, Pagadian, Balingasag, and Don Carlos.

== Etymology and background ==
The word Sinulog comes from the Cebuano adverb sulog, roughly meaning water current, an analogy to the forward–backward dance movements, performed to the sound of drums. This is a ritual prayer dance honoring the Señor Santo Niño, or Child Jesus.

According to historical accounts, Cebuanos performed similar dances in honor of animist idols long before the introduction of Christianity to the Philippines, which reached Cebu with the arrival of Ferdinand Magellan at the head of a Spanish expedition on April 7, 1521. The original image of the Santo Niño was reportedly left by the Magellan expedition and rediscovered when the Spanish returned in 1565, during an expedition led by Miguel López de Legazpi, which played a significant role in the subsequent Spanish colonial period in the Philippines.

Sinulog is observed as a celebration of the Filipino people's embrace of Christianity, marking a significant moment in the country's religious and cultural history, particularly in Cebu province. The first Christian conversion happened in 1521 on the island of Cebu, when the Indianized-Sanskritized ruler Rajah Humabon and his queen Amihan (Humamay) were baptized along with their subjects, becoming Carlos and Juana of Cebu.

== History ==
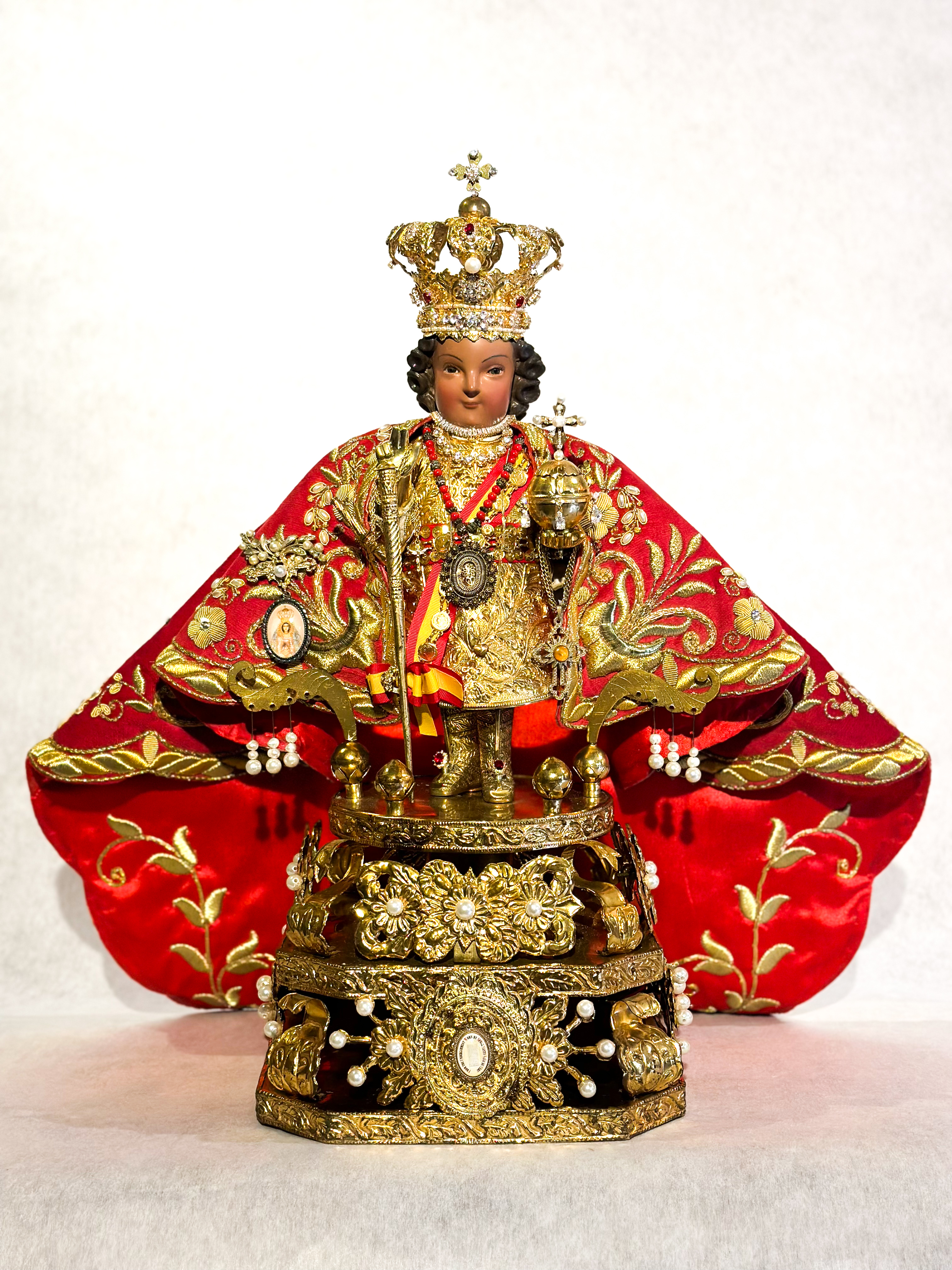
Santo Niño de Cebu was brought to the Philippines during the Magellan expedition.

On March 16, 1521, Ferdinand Magellan arrived and planted the Christian cross on the shores of Cebu, claiming the territory for Spain. He presented the image of the Child Jesus to the Rajah Humabon. Hara Humamay (or Amihan, in some versions) was later named Queen Juana, after Juana, mother of Charles I of Spain, and she, along with the rulers of the island and some 800 natives, were converted to the Christian faith.

Some Sinulog dances interpret the historical events surrounding the arrival of the Spaniards and the presentation of the Santo Niño to Queen Juana, though other performances may emphasize different aspects of the festival's history and significance. A popular theme among Sinulog dances is Queen Juana holding the Santo Niño in her arms and using it to bless her people, who were often afflicted with sickness believed to be caused by demons and other evil spirits.

=== Arrival of López de Legazpi ===
The expedition led by Miguel Lopez de Legazpi bombarded the native settlement when it arrived on April 28, 1565. Inside a burning hut, one of Legazpi's men, Juan Camus, discovered the image of the Santo Niño inside a wooden pine box. When Legazpi arrived, he found that the natives performed dances, which were later associated with the honoring of the Santo Niño. The Augustinian friars who accompanied López de Legazpi on his expedition built a church on the site where the image of the Santo Niño was found, which later became the Basilica Minore del Santo Niño.

=== Recent ===
Since the 16th century, there has been great devotion to the Santo Niño in Philippine popular piety, particularly in the Visayas. Pilgrims from different parts of Cebu and the rest of the country make a yearly journey to the church to take part in the procession and festival. Starting in 1980, the Cebu City government organized the Sinulog Festival and eventually gave incentives also to tribal dance groups.

The first Sinulog parade was held on January 20, 1980, organized by Dávid Odilao, then regional director of the Ministry of Youth and Sports Development, with the Sinulog conceptualized to be a "true Cebuano festival", comparable to the Dinagyang of Iloilo and the Ati-atihan of Aklan, both of which also celebrate the feast of Santo Niño. The idea caught on, and under the direction of then-Cebu City mayor Florentino Solon, the project was led by the Cebu City Historical Committee.

In the 2000s and early 2010s, law and order during the Sinulog celebration was an issue. Large street parties were celebrated throughout the city, notably along General Maxilom Avenue, also known as Mango Avenue, and the Baseline area along Juana Osmeña Street. Rowdy partygoers often caused trouble, and many were later found sleeping along the city's streets due to intoxication. In 2016, street parties along the Sinulog carousel route were banned in an effort to control most of these disturbances.

The Devotee City, a temporary settlement consisting of reused shipping containers, was launched in 1996 to accommodate devotees traveling from far-flung areas who had no other place to stay in the city. It has usually been located in the open space surrounding the Compania Maritima building, only a few meters away from the Magellan's Cross and the Basilica del Santo Niño.

The festival was cancelled in 2021 due to the COVID-19 pandemic, and again in 2022 due to the devastation caused by Typhoon Rai to Cebu. In 2023, the grand parade was moved to South Road Properties from the Cebu City Sports Center, its longtime home. It was moved back in August 2024, after two years.

Sinulog is celebrated worldwide in Filipino communities, including in cities such as Barcelona, Spain; Prague, Czechia; Dresden, Germany; Brisbane, Australia; Omaha, Nebraska; Philadelphia, Pennsylvania; and Port St. Lucie, Florida.

== Gallery ==
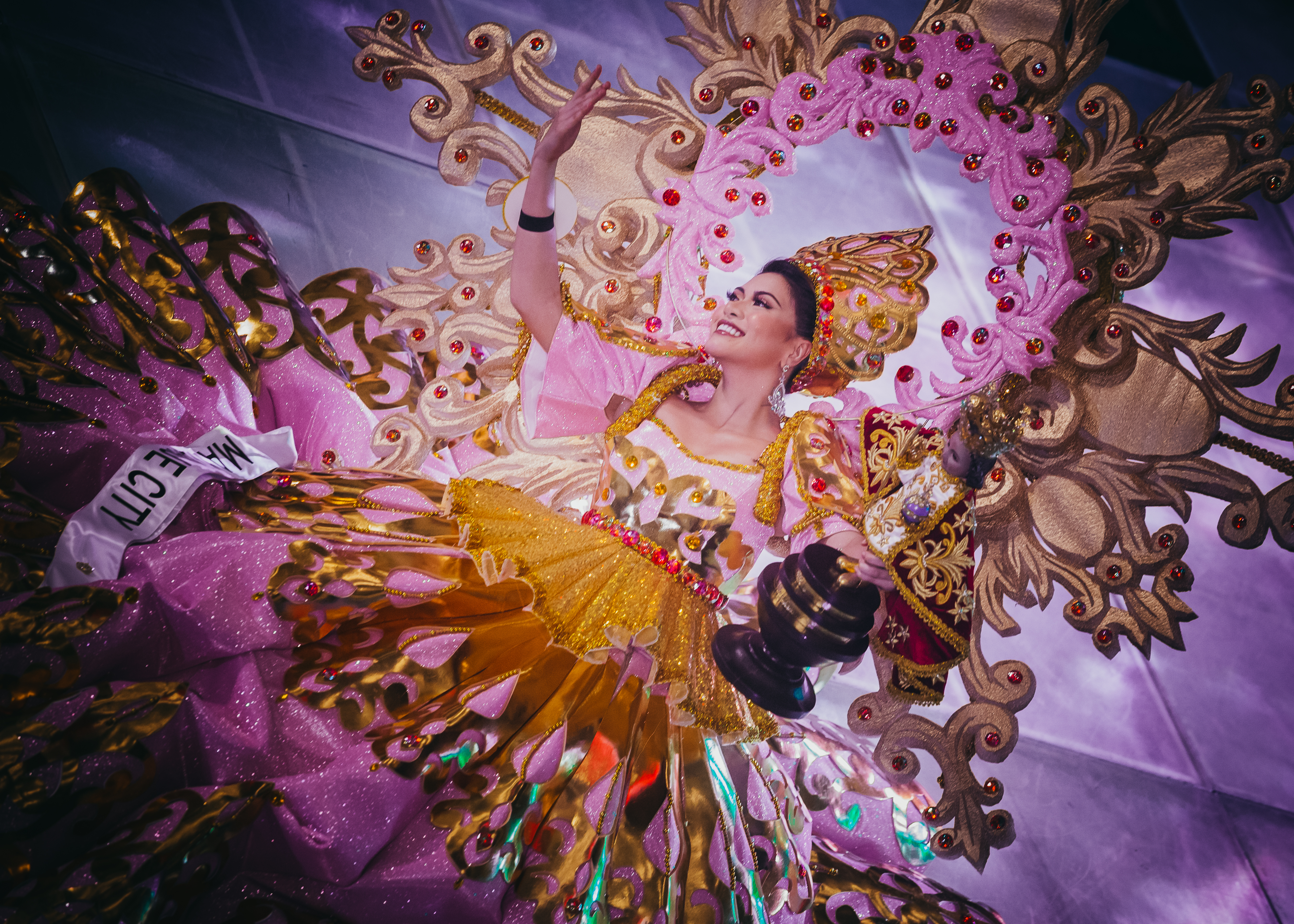
Sinulog festival queen

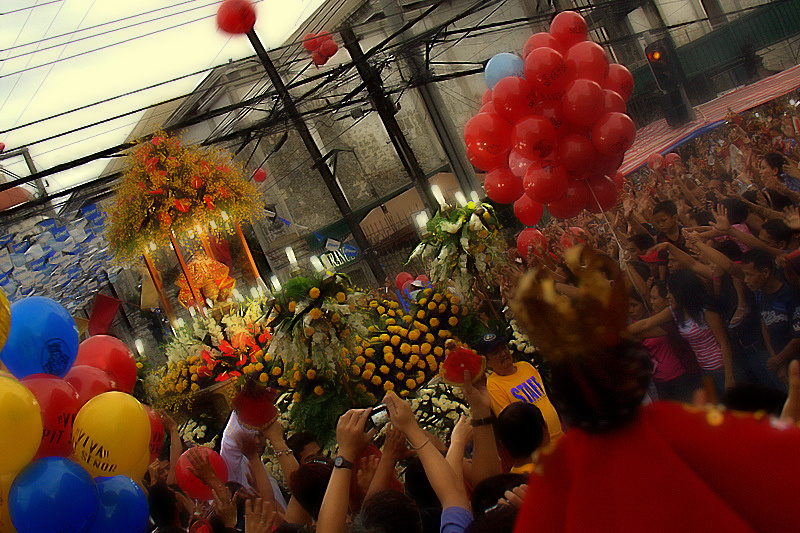
Street procession

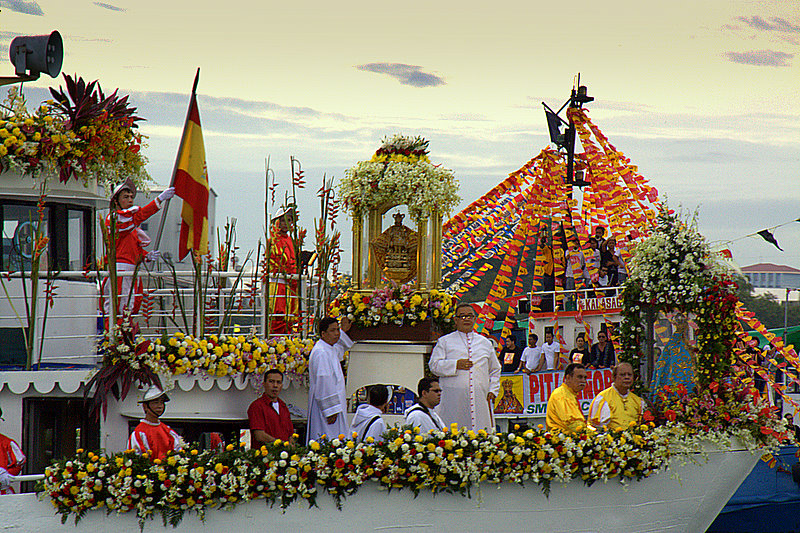
River procession

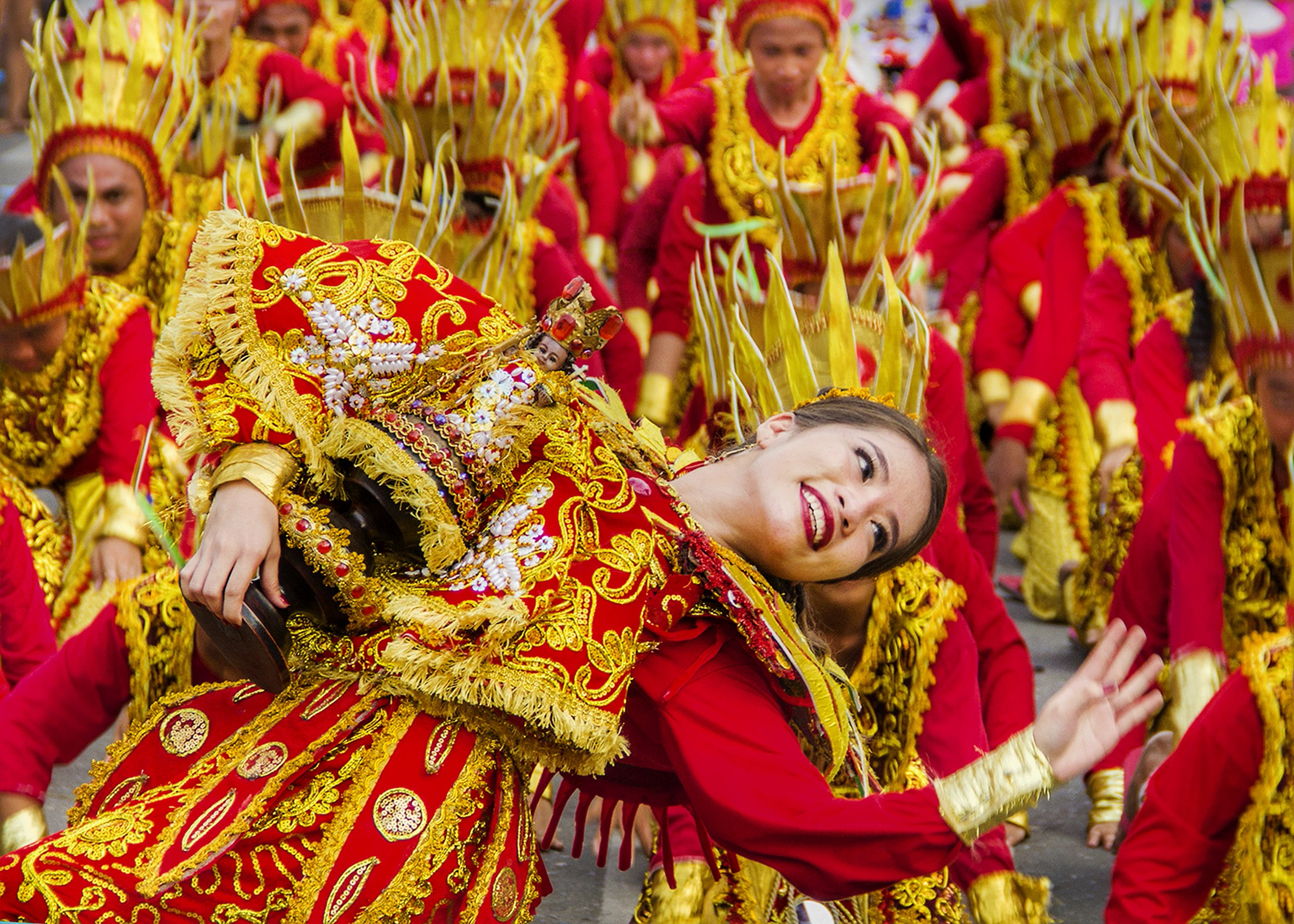
Street dancing

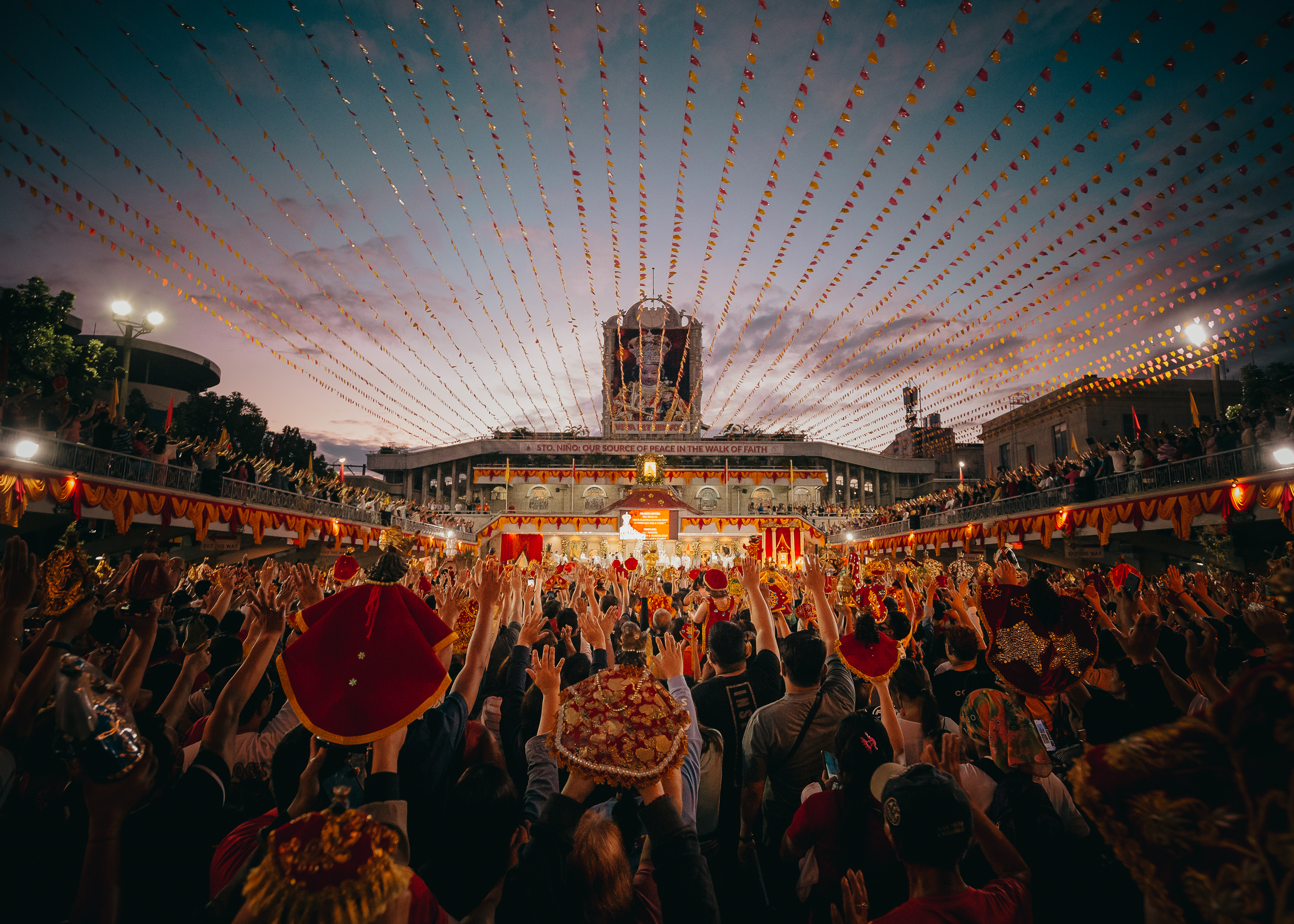
Novena mass at Basilica del Santo Niño

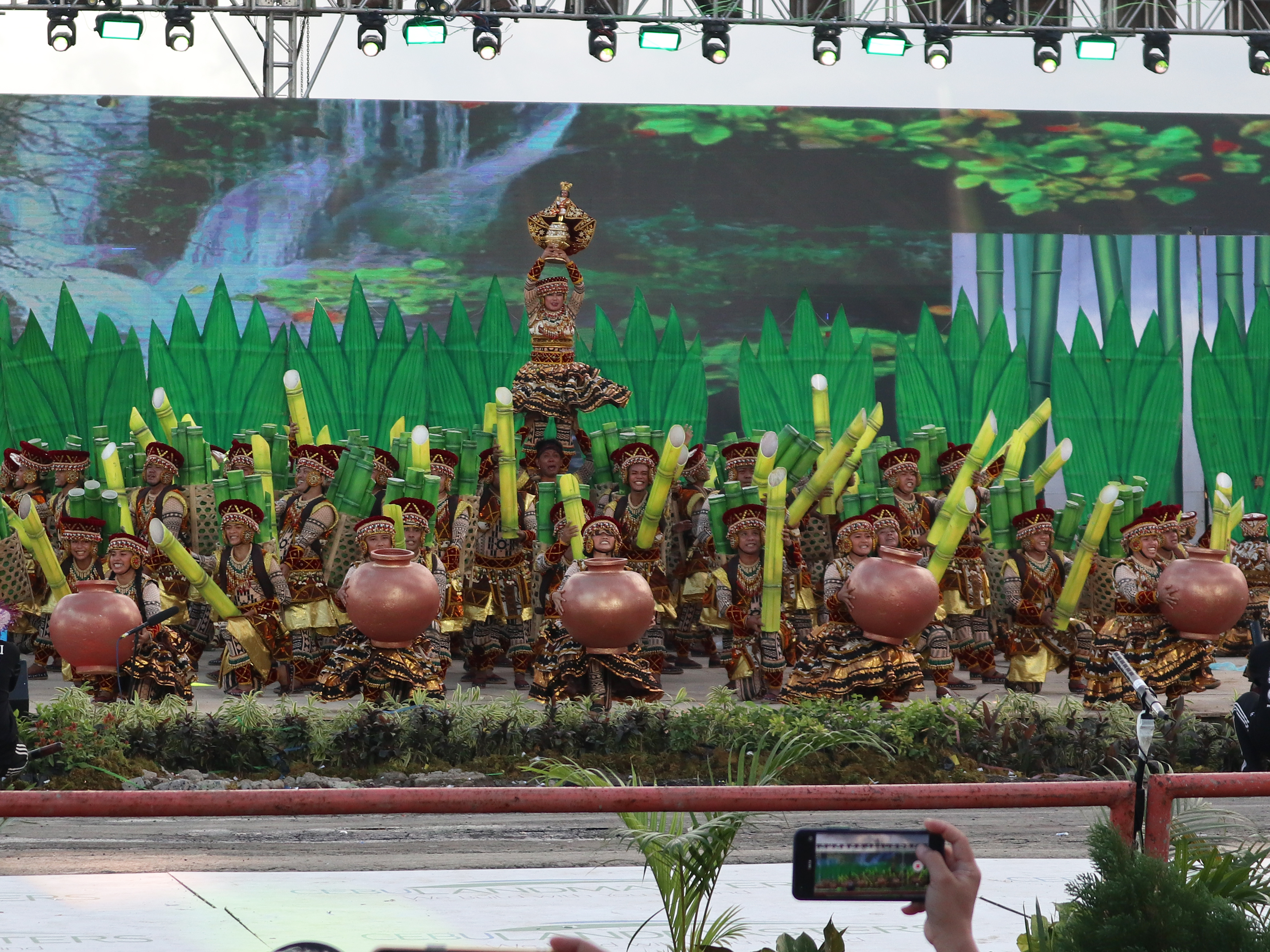
Stage performance by the dancers known as the Ritual Showdown

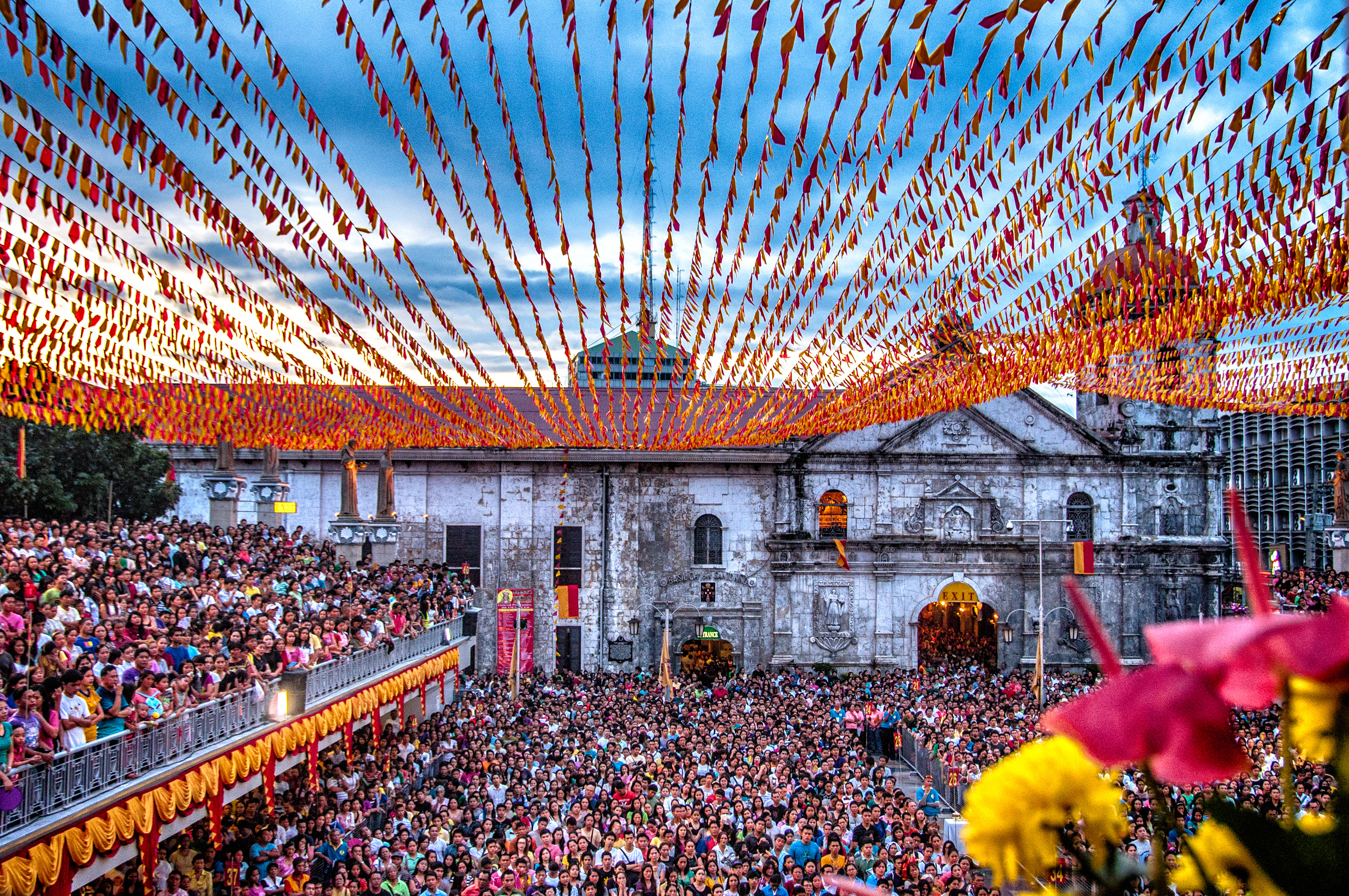
Catholics attending mass at the Pilgrim's Center of the Basilica del Santo Niño in Cebu City

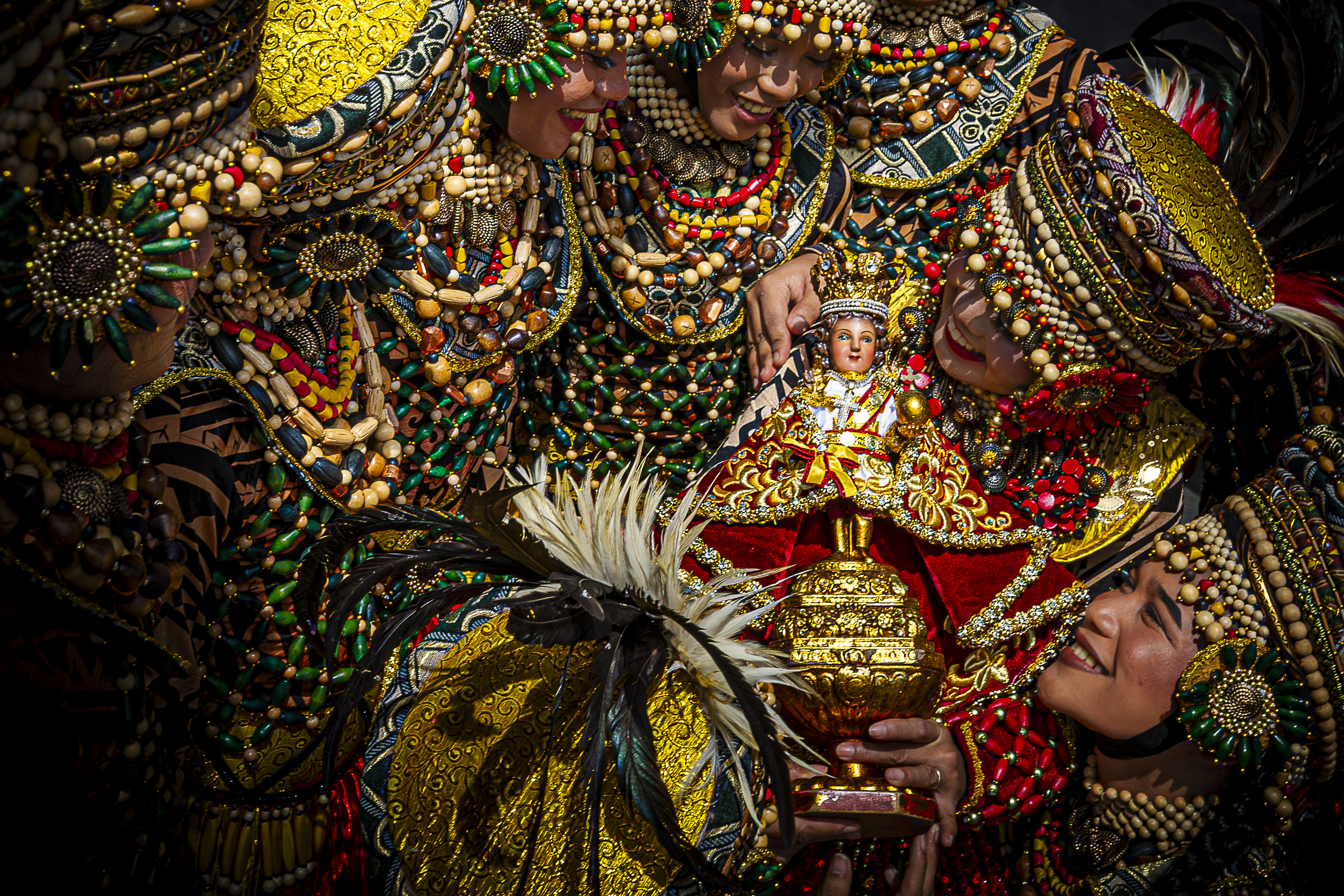
Festival dancers with the Santo Niño

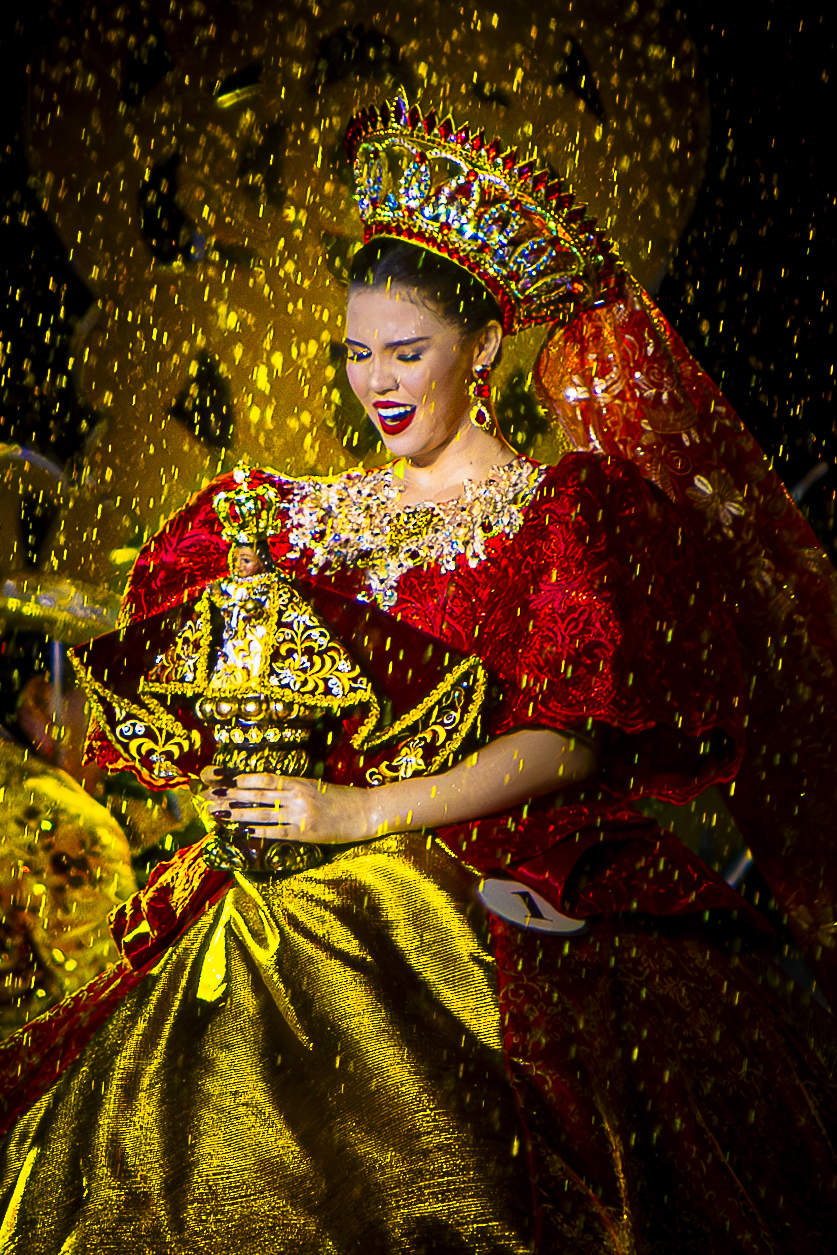
2025 Sinulog festival queen

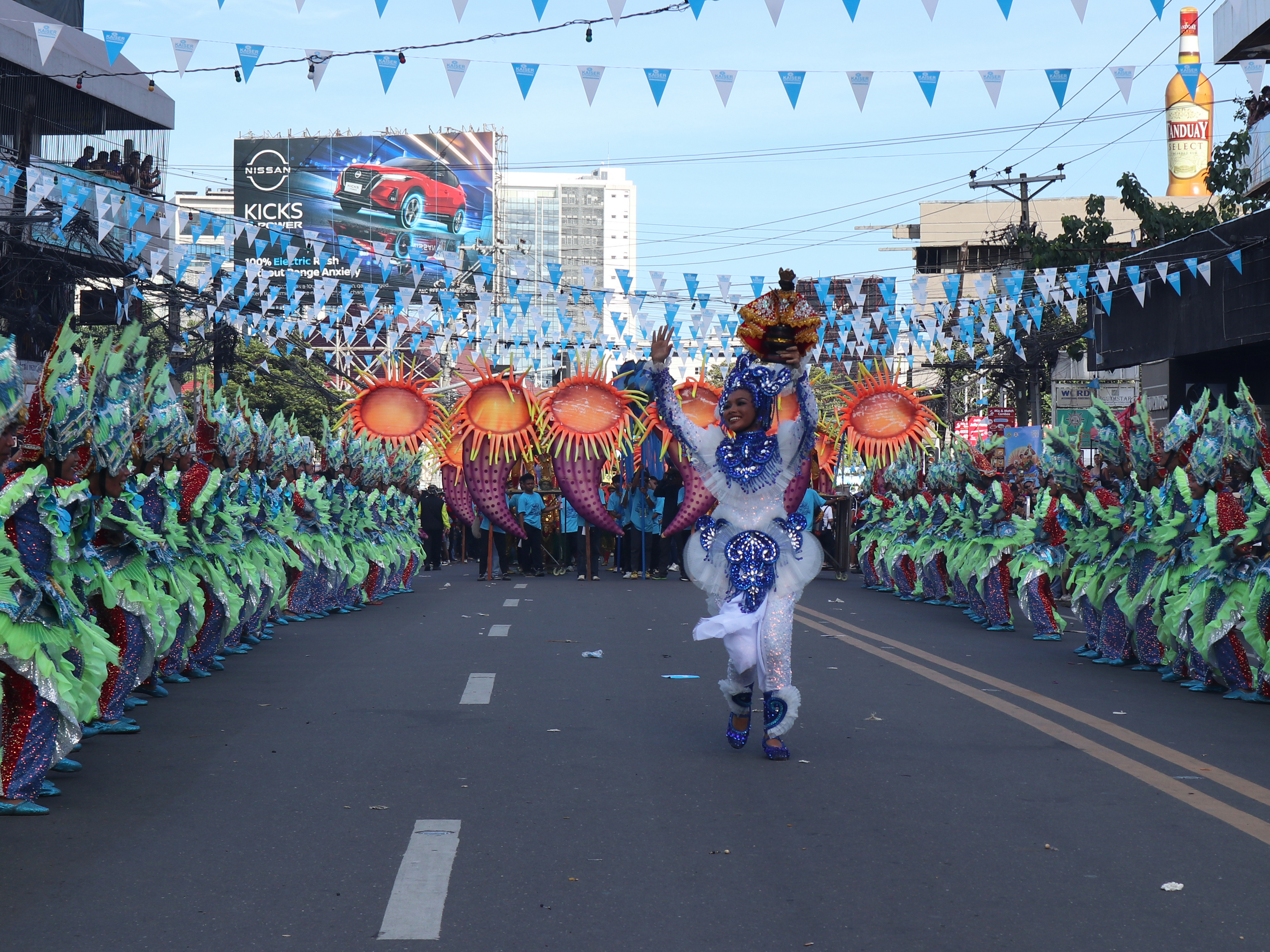
Bais City contingent at the 2025 Sinulog festival 2025 in Cebu City

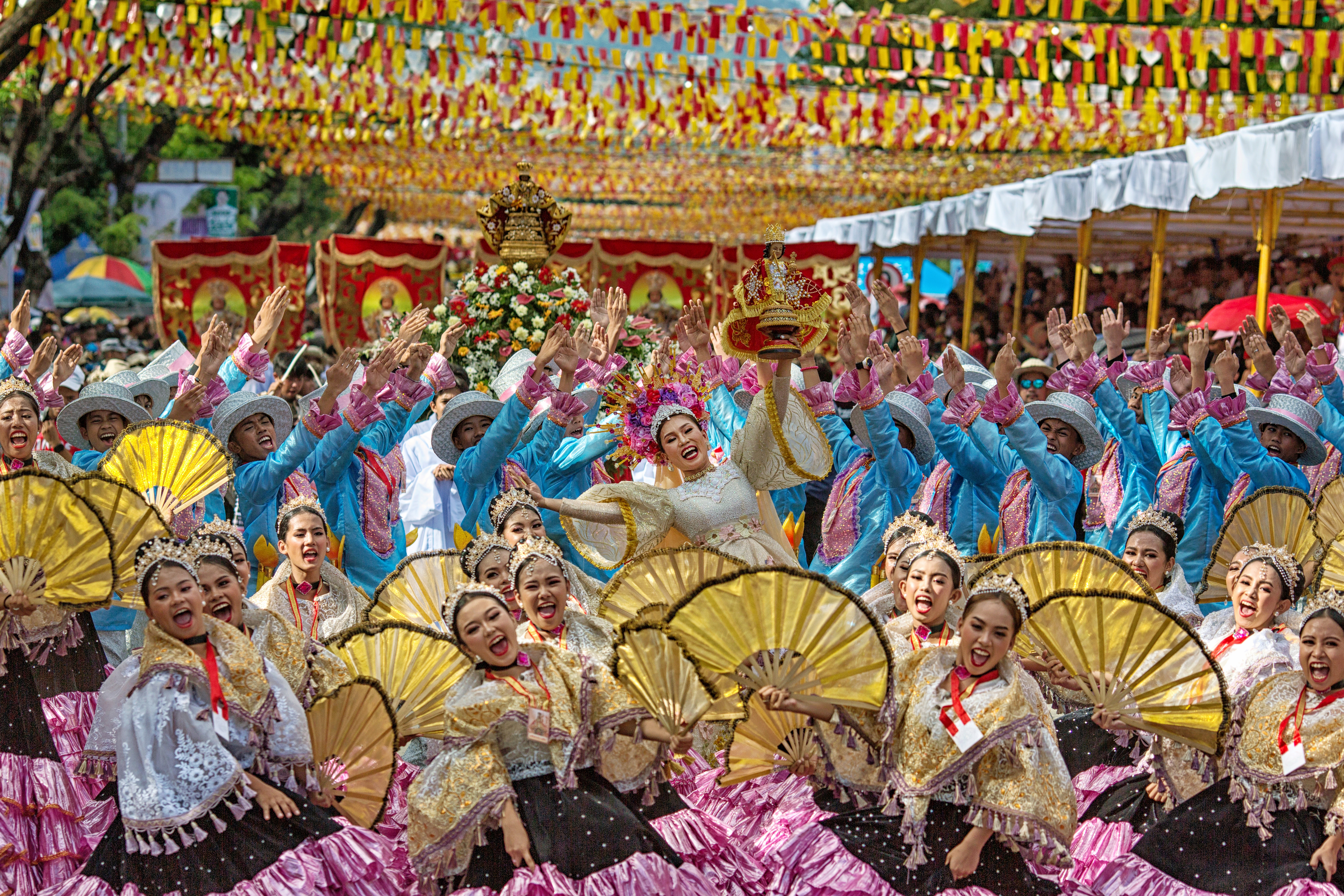
2025 Sinulog celebration in Cebu City

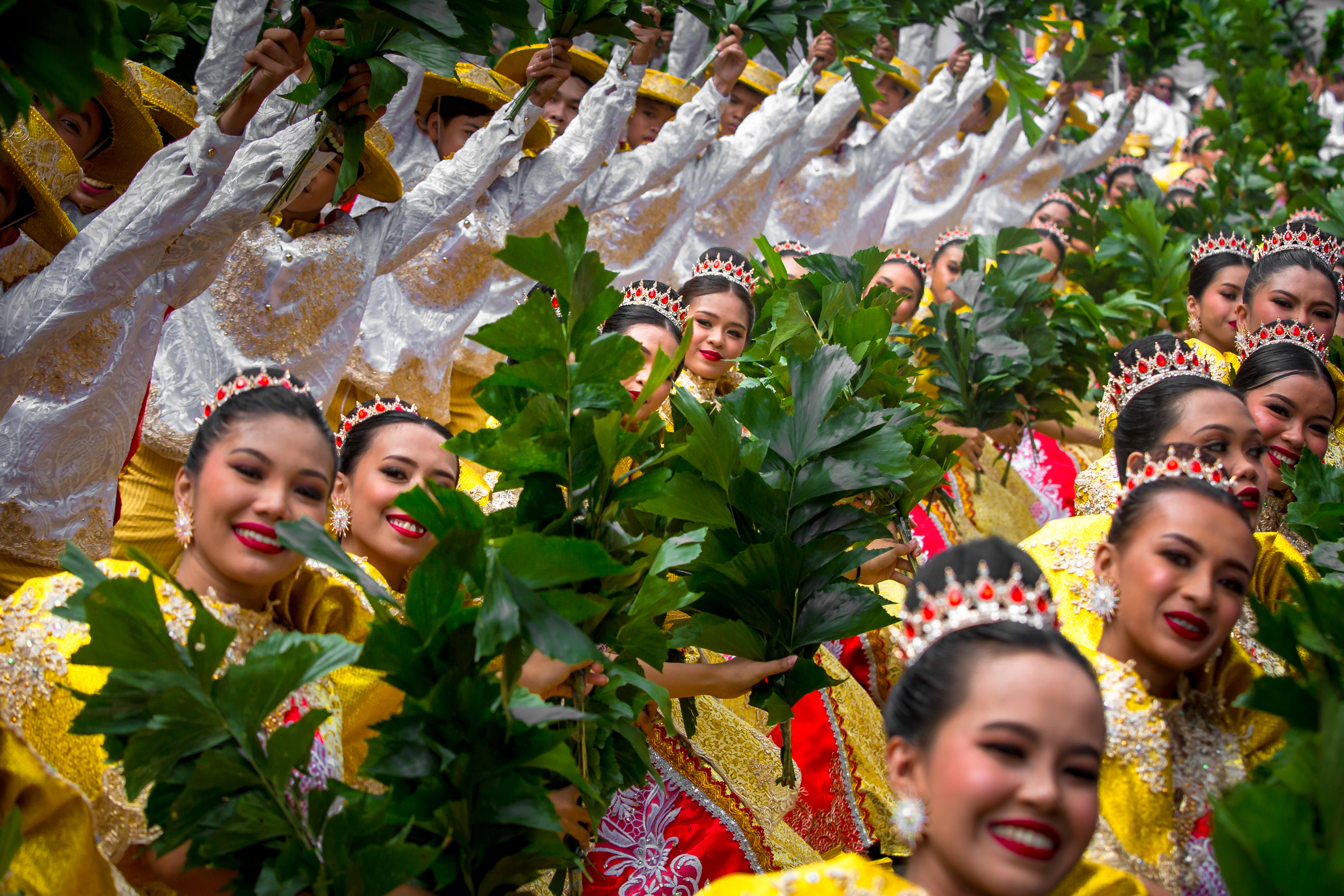
2025 Sinulog celebration in Cebu City

== Logo ==
In the 1980s, the Cebu City Historical Committee and the Cebuano community—the creators of the Sinulog Festival—adopted an official logo to establish it as a permanent annual event. They turned to the coat of arms of the Santo Niño, which consists of a two-headed hawk, the mark of the ruling House of Habsburg in Europe. At the time when Spain sent expeditions to the Philippines, it was under the Habsburg dynasty. The emblem represented the twin purpose of the Habsburg dynasty as "Champion of Catholicism and Defender of the Faith". The committee chose to use an indigenous warrior's shield, symbolizing Filipino resistance to colonization, with the Santo Niño's coat of arms printed on its face, representing the country's acceptance of Christianity.

== See also ==
- List of Sinulog Festival winners
