= Eduardo Rama Jr. =

Filipino politician (born 1978)

Edu Rama
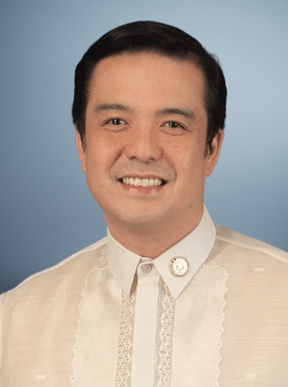
- Official portrait, 2025

House Deputy Majority Leader
- Incumbent
- Assumed office July 30, 2025
- Speaker: Martin Romualdez
- Leader: Sandro Marcos

Member of the Philippine House of Representatives from Cebu City's 2nd district
- Incumbent
- Assumed office June 30, 2022
- Preceded by: Rodrigo Abellanosa

Member of the Cebu City Council from the 2nd District
- In office June 30, 2016 – June 30, 2022
- In office June 30, 2004 – June 30, 2013
Council Positions
Committees Chaired	ICT, Public Services, Social Services
Presiding Officer Pro Tempore
In office July 29, 2020 – June 20, 2022
Preceded by	Antonio Cuenco
Succeeded by	Dondon Hontiveros
In office July 5, 2016 – August 30, 2016
Preceded by	Margarita Osmeña
Succeeded by	David Tumulak

Head of the Cebu City Barangay Affairs Office
- In office June 30, 2013 – October 16, 2015

Personal details
- Born: Eduardo Roa Rama Jr. December 2, 1978 (age 47) Cebu City, Cebu, Philippines
- Party: Partido Barug (local, 2012–present); Lakas (national; 2003–2009; 2023–present)
- Other political affiliations: BOPK (local; 2003–2013); PDP-Laban (2017–2023); UNA (2012–2017); Liberal (2009–2012)
- Spouse: Georgia Felice "Jaja" Chiongbian-Rama
- Children: 3
- Parents: Eduardo "Eddie" Lopez Rama Sr. (father); Thelma Bacan Roa (mother)
- Relatives: Rama family
- Education: Centre for International Education Global Colleges (BS)
- Occupation: Politician
- Profession: Businessman

Eduardo "Edu" Roa Rama Jr. (born December 2, 1978) is a Filipino politician and businessman currently serving as the Representative of Cebu City's 2nd (South) district since 2022. He previously served as Cebu City councilor from 2004 to 2013, and again from 2016 to 2022.

== Early life and education ==
Rama was born on December 2, 1978 to Eduardo "Eddie" Lopez Rama Sr. and Thelma Bacan Roa. Eddie served as Governor (1988–1995) and Congressman (1995-1998) of Agusan del Norte, and was the older brother of former Cebu City Mayor Mike Rama.

Rama completed his secondary education at Sacred Heart School – Ateneo de Cebu, and his bachelor's degree in business administration at the British Centre for International Education (CIE) in 2004.

== Political career ==
=== Cebu City Council (2004–2013) ===
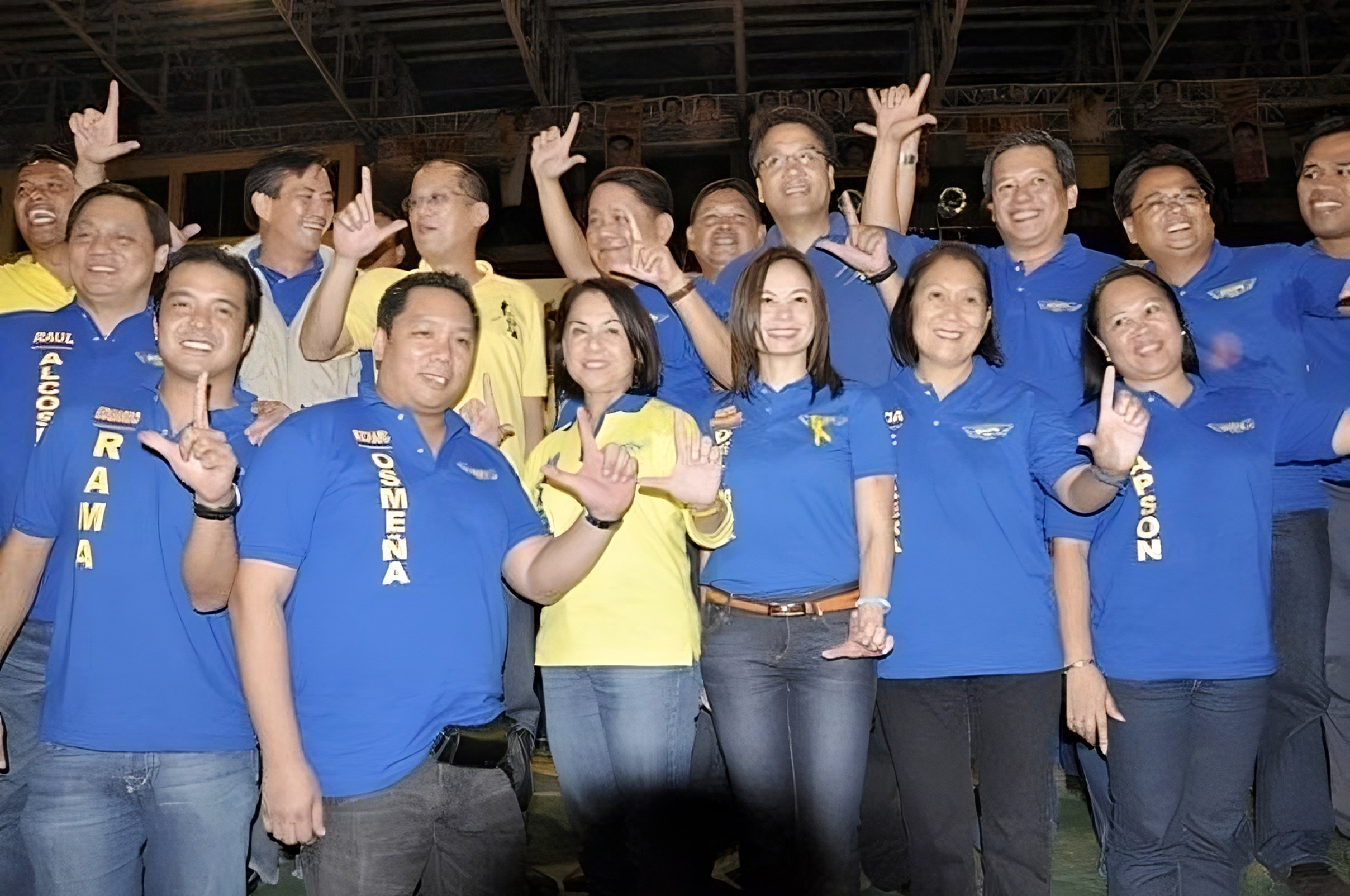
Rama (leftmost, front row) as a then-BOPK reelectionist during the 2010 Cebu City local elections, campaigning with Tomas Osmeña, Mike Rama, and Liberal standard bearers Noynoy Aquino and Mar Roxas

Rama first entered public office at 25 years old as a city councilor from Cebu City's 2nd (South) district in 2004, then a member of the Bando Osmeña – Pundok Kauswagan (BOPK) led by Mayor Tomas Osmeña. He was re-elected to a second and third term in 2007 and 2010, respectively, with BOPK holding all council positions.

During the 12th Sangguniang Panlungsod (2010–2013) and Rama's third term, he served as chair of the council's committee on services, which had oversight of city departments such as the General Services Office.

Following the October 15, 2012 earthquake that damaged the Cebu City Medical Center (CCMC), Rama and City Chief Legal Officer Gerone Castillo met with regional officials of the Bureau of Fire Protection (BFP) to discuss the ownership of the BFP-7 property that the city was using as a temporary facility for the CCMC. The city and BFP were engaged in a legal dispute over the property's ownership, exacerbated by the lack of clear land titles and supporting documents.

It was during Rama's third term (2010–2013) that Mike Rama bolted BOPK and the Liberal Party and later formed Team Rama to challenge Osmeña and BOPK in the 2013 elections. Among the BOPK members and officials who defected to Team Rama were current and former city councilors Edu Rama, Jose "Joey" Daluz III, Edwin Jagmoc, Sylvan "Jack" Jakosalem, future vice mayor and mayor Edgardo Labella, and Jocelyn "Joy" Pesquera.

=== Hiatus from elected office (2013–2016) ===
Rama left office at the end of his third term on June 30, 2013, due to term limits and not running for another elective position. He was appointed as head of the city's Barangay Affairs Office (BAO) under the administration of his uncle, re-elected Mayor Mike Rama.

In March 2014, Rama was tasked by Mayor Mike Rama to ensure the presence of street lights in Barangay Labangon after the latter ordered the removal of a PHP 300,000 (USD 5,400) center island and street lighting project that was funded by the Barangay. Mayor Rama was later suspended by the Office of the President of the Philippines for 60 days due to abuse of power.

On January 27, 2015, Rama announced the death of his uncle (father's first cousin), Basak San Nicolas Barangay Captain and former city councilor George R. Rama, who died the previous day due to complications from pneumonia and sepsis. Rama made the public announcement on behalf of his family, the Rama clan.

Rama filed his candidacy for city councilor anew on October 16, 2015, now under his uncle's UNA-affiliated Partido Panaghiusa–Team Rama lineup for the 2016 Cebu City local elections. This resulted in Rama's ipso facto resignation as Cebu City BAO head, as Philippine law deems any appointive government official or employee as having resigned automatically upon filing their candidacy for elective office.

=== Return to the council (2016–2022) ===
Following the 2016 elections, Mike Rama lost re-election as mayor, while Vice Mayor Labella successfully defended his seat and the younger Rama returned to the council as part of a new BARUG majority. During the 14th Sangguniang Panlungsod (2016–2019), Rama served as Presiding officer pro tempore, as well as chair of the council committees on Information and Communication Technology and Public Services. After losing his chairmanships after BOPK secured he council majority mid-term, Rama once again became Presiding officer pro tempore in July 2020, also regaining his former committee chair posts in addition to the social services committee.

AS ICT committee chair, Rama also served as chair of the Information and Communication Technology Business Process Management (ICT-BPM) Council and Micro, Small and Medium Enterprise Development (MSMED) Council. In this capacity, he handled the city's Near-Hire Program and Cebu City Call Center Program, which his office claims helped over 2,000 jobseekers find employment in the city's call centers.

Rama and a majority of Team Rama's (now renamed Partido Barug, or BARUG) officials switched national political parties from UNA to PDP-Laban, the new ruling party led by President Rodrigo Duterte, on August 27, 2016. Former Mayor Mike Rama was excluded from the induction of new PDP-Laban members due to his then-inclusion on Duterte's narco-list, with then-House Speaker and PDP-Laban Secretary General Pantaleon Alvarez commenting that "the crime of one [is] not the fault [of] all."

On January 9, 2017, Rama was one of nine opposition BARUG councilors who voted for a resolution by Councilor Joey Daluz III to override Osmeña's line item veto of the city government's PHP 7.2 billion 2017 annual budget. Osmeña vetoed over 15 items under budget ordinances 2472 and 2471, saying they restricted his authority as mayor to manage the affairs of the City. The resolution failed to gather the twelve votes needed to override the mayor's veto.

In August 2017, Rama responded to questioning from then-majority floor leader Margot Osmeña (BOPK) over pledges for the construction of the Cebu City Medical Center (CCMC) by saying that the suspension of work on the CCMC after Mayor Osmeña returned to office the previous year discouraged further donations.

Following the murder of former Ermita barangay captain and BARUG councilorial candidate Felicismo "Imok" Rupinta in November 2017, Rama joined Vice Mayor Labella and several other opposition councilors who wore black armbands and passed a city resolution condemning Mayor Osmeña for his statements accusing the late Rupinta of being a drug protector.

In February 2019, Rama was one of the seven BARUG councilors who sought and failed to halt the PHP 18 billion (USD 344.9 million) Kawit Island project in the South Road Properties which later resulted in Nustar Resort and Casino. The Regional Trial Court Branch 21, rather than granting the councilors' petition, referred the case for mediation. Osmeña welcomed the development, saying that the project was open to a Swiss challenge for months and that it would infuse billions into the city's economy.

==== 2019 elections and fifth council term ====
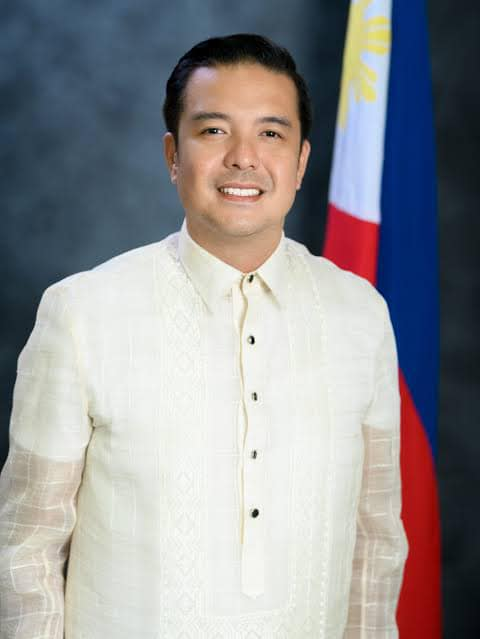
Rama's official portrait as Cebu City Councilor, 2019

On October 17, 2018, Rama and other BARUG members filed their candidacies for the 2019 elections. Vice Mayor Edgardo Labella, term-limited in his position, ran for mayor, while Mike Rama ran for vice mayor. Rama, along with a mix of candidates from BARUG and BOPK, was endorsed by the Iglesia Ni Cristo, a sect controversial for its bloc-voting and legal issues.

BARUG won the May 13, 2019 elections decisively, with Labella unseating Osmeña, Mike Rama returning as vice mayor for a fourth term, and Rama joining a BARUG council majority with nine of sixteen seats. Observers attributed BARUG's electoral success partly to a high level of involvement by President Duterte in favor of BARUG and Labella, which included sustained attacks on Osmeña and BOPK. The winning candidates were proclaimed over two-day period following election night, with the delay due to technical issues.

In August 2019, the council placed Barangay Kalunasan, Cebu City under a state of calamity due to sewage defects in the city's two jails that have persisted since 2015. Rama joined a council task force formed to address problem, chaired by Councilor Nestor Archival.

==== COVID-19 pandemic ====
In April 2020, Rama, as chair of the council's Committee on Information Technology (IT), requested the city government to investigate the alleged "subhuman" living conditions of Amazon contractors in Teleperformance's Cebu IT Park offices. The issue went viral after the British newspaper Financial Times (FT) published an exposé showing hundreds of employees having to sleep on floors and gym equipment due to Amazon contracts stipulating that all work must be done on-site, in violation of a supposed promise of decent accommodations for the employees and on the pain of termination. A copy of an employee contract seen by the FT showed that employees who spoke to the media would be held legally liable for "damages" of at least PHP 500,000 (USD 10,317), which forced employees to aid the investigation anonymously. Industry executive Wilfredo Sa-a Jr., managing director of the Cebu City Information Technology-Business Process Management Organization (IT-BPMO)—a business association of the city's IT companies—labeled the affair as an "isolated case," to which the national BPO Industry Employees Network responded by saying that similar conditions were happening in call centers all over the country.

The Philippine News Agency (PNA) reported in June 2020 that Rama and Councilor Raymond Alvin Garcia facilitated the city's distribution of face masks donated from the private sector.

On October 14, 2020, Rama criticized the construction of the PHP 800 million (USD 15.8 million) Mambaling Underpass along Natalio Bacalso Avenue as a "failure" from the "very beginning" due to persistent flooding. The underpass was supposed to be constructed with a drainage system based those of Kuala Lumpur, Malaysia on that used flood tunnels and cisterns to avert flooding. However, the drainage system was completely absent from the final project, for which Rama criticized then-2nd (South) District Congressman Rodrigo "Bebot" Abellanosa. A SunStar Cebu article attributed most of the blame to the project implementor, the Department of Public Works and Highways (DPWH), while also criticizing the city government (including Rama), as well as Abellanosa for oversight failures.

Rama joined the council's ad hoc committee for helping Mayor Labella "refocus and streamline" the city's 2021 annual budget. The committee was created by Vice Mayor Mike Rama in December 2020, with Councilors Rama, Garcia, and Philip Zafra from the BARUG majority and Councilors Archival, Dizon, Franklyn Ong, and Ouano-Japson from the BOPK minority. A SunStar Cebu editorial described the budget as "undeniably an election budget" due to the upcoming 2022 elections.

On March 4, 2021, the city government gave new firetrucks to Barangays Duljo Fatima, Calamba, San Roque and San Jose, which previously lacked firetrucks of their own. Duljo Fatima Barangay Captain Elmer Abella, in an interview with PhilSTAR, thanked Rama as one of the city officials who lobbied for the Barangays to receive firetrucks.

In June 2021, Rama, as chair of the council's committee on public services, pushed for at least three more garbage transfer stations across the city due to congestion and lack of capacity at the current garbage transfer station in Barangay Inayawan.

On July 5, 2021, Rama publicly criticized a resident of Inayawan, Cebu City named Ronald Abay-Abay Villaver after city environmental enforcers found hospital waste from Bohol that Villaver allegedly illegally dumped on another private citizen's property. Rama said that Villaver was notorious for such violations, having received several complaints about Villaver while serving as chair of the council's public services committee. The criticism was echoed by city councilor and former Tisa Barangay Captain Philip Zafra, who alleged that Villaver also illegally dumped garbage in Tisa, as well as Inayawan Barangay Captain Kirk Bryan Repollo and the three city department heads who participated in the inspection following complaints from Inayawan residents.

Rama met with representatives of the city's hospitals and healthcare sector, revealing on July 28, 2021 that the city government would give PHP 30,000 (USD 600) in incentives to 350 nurses in private hospitals amid COVID-19 surges and resource shortages. The city also hired another 100 nurses for the Cebu City Medical Center (CCMC) and the Cebu City Quarantine Center, as well as another 100 nurses for private hospitals, in an attempt to mitigate the shortage of health professionals during the pandemic; an undeclared number of nurses had already previously resigned from the CCMC due to months-long delays in receiving their salaries.

On November 29, 2021, the city council placed Sitio Lawis in Barangay Mambaling under a state of calamity following a fire that displaced 670 families. Rama pushed for the approved resolution, while maintaining that the council was acting on the recommendation of the City Disaster Risk Reduction and Management Council (CDRRMC).

Amid the rise in COVID-19 cases in Cebu City in July 2021, Rama was tasked with handling the conversion and management of the Cebu City Sports Center as a back-up isolation site complementing the Cebu City Quarantine Center, which at the time had an occupancy rate of 45 percent.

On January 5, 2022, Rama met with the Region 7 office of the Environmental Management Bureau (EMB-7), an agency under the Department of Environment and Natural Resources (DENR), to discuss a temporary transfer station for garbage and debris collected in clearing operations following Super Typhoon Odette (International name: Typhoon Rai) in December 2021. The EMB-7 flagged the transfer station as illegal due to lack of permits, despite Mayor Mike Rama's claim that DENR Secretary Roy Cimatu allowed the city to use the space as a temporary dumping cite for debris. The EMB-7 granted more time for clearing operations, with the garbage and debris eventually being transferred to the Binaliw Landfill and other facilities.

==== Council legislative record ====
As reported by local news sources and Rama's office, he was involved in authoring and passing the following city ordinances, also including 24 approved resolutions from 2016 to 2019:

- A PHP 2.5 million (USD USD 58,333) Earn As You Learn (EAYL) program for I.T. students, patterned after an industry-government-academe partnership between IBM Australia, the University of Ballarat and the Victoria State Government, approved in March 2012;
- Creation of the Information and Communication Technology Business Process Management (ICT-BPM) Council and Micro, Small and Medium Enterprise Development (MSMED) Councils as policy advisory bodies;
- Granting protection to sharks, stingrays, and other marine wildlife within the jurisdiction of the city, passed during the 14th Sangguniang Panlungsod (2016–2019) in 2018;
- Declaring a state of calamity in Duljo-Fatima, Cebu City after a fire displaced 524 individuals, approved by the council on January 8, 2020;
- Mandating discounts on goods and services for registered single parents in establishments within Cebu City, authored with BOPK councilors Alvin Dizon and Lea Ouano-Japson and approved by the council on March 4, 2020;
- Mandatory hygiene awareness signs in public utility vehicles (PUVs), schools, and business establishments, approved in August 2021;
- Cebu City Freedom of Information (FOI) ordinance, approved in June 2022;

=== House of Representatives (2022–present) ===
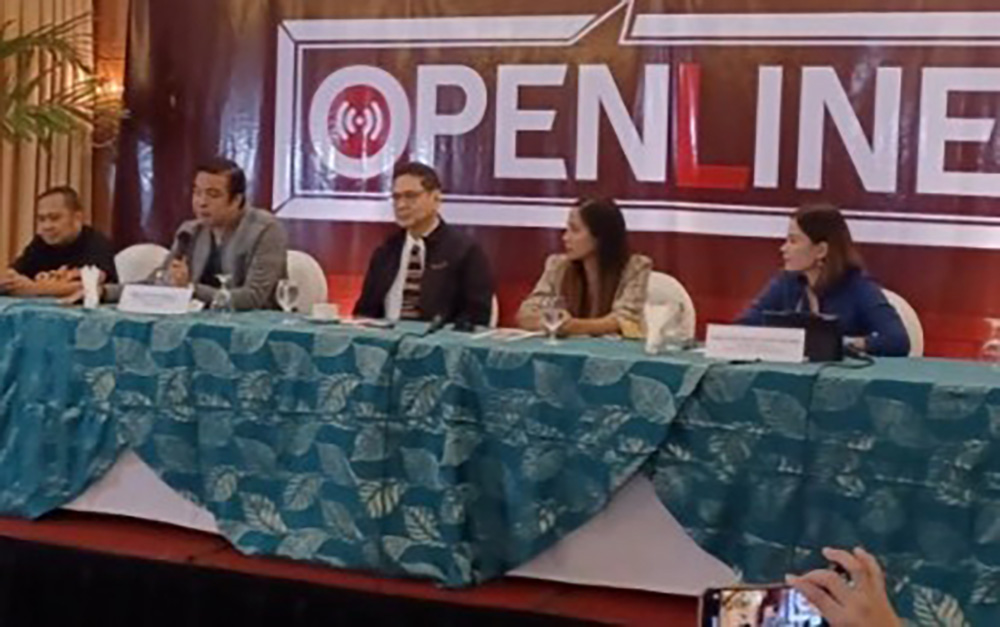
Cebu City Representatives-elect Rama (second from left) and Cutie del Mar (rightmost) at a forum held at the Casino Español on June 7, 2022

On October 9, 2021, Rama filed his candidacy for the Member of the House of Representatives from Cebu City's 2nd (South) district. He ran under the coalition between BARUG PDP-Laban, KUSUG, and the newly revived Partido Panaghiusa led by Mike Rama and city councilor Raymond Alvin Garcia. Rama ran his campaign with the platform "H.E.A.L. Cebu City", with the acronym representing his health, education, agriculture, and livelihood platforms.

Councilors Dondon Hontiveros and Philip Zafra, despite being BARUG members, filed their candidacies as independents. A month later, the two jointly announced that they would stay with BARUG instead of continuing to run as independents. Hontiveros and Zafra named Rama as one of the party leaders who were instrumental in their decision.

The Rama-Garcia coalition, which endorsed the UniTeam led by presidential candidate Bongbong Marcos and vice-presidential candidate Sara Duterte, was also endorsed by outgoing President Rodrigo Duterte on April 2, 2022. Duterte later announced his personal endorsement of Rama for Congress on April 5, given during a private dinner at Mactan-Benito Ebuen Airbase in Lapu-Lapu City. Rama won the congressional race, becoming the first South District Representative from BARUG, while Mike Rama, Garcia, and a renewed BARUG city council majority won a decisive victory with twelve out of sixteen seats.

In June 2022, Rama and Cebu City 1st (North) District Representative-elect Rachel del Mar announced that they would push for the creation of the Mega Cebu Development Authority (MCDA) in Congress. Del Mar's father, the late Rep. Raul del Mar, was a proponent of the Mega Cebu proposal, which stalled following opposition by then-Mayor Osmeña due to what BARUG Councilor Noel Wenceslao alleged was the project's proximity to Osmeña's political rivals Gwendolyn Garcia and Mike Rama. Representatives-elect Rama and Del Mar also called for the creation of additional legislative districts in Cebu City due to its high population.

During the 19th Congress (2022–2025), Rama served as Vice Chairperson of the House Committees on Local Government and Natural Resources. He was also a member for the majority of seven other committees, namely: Appropriations, Basic Education and Culture, Energy, Information and Communications Technology, Public Accounts, Public Order and Safety, and Social Services. The resulting law re-establishing the NIR, R.A. 12000, was eventually signed by President Marcos on June 11, 2024.

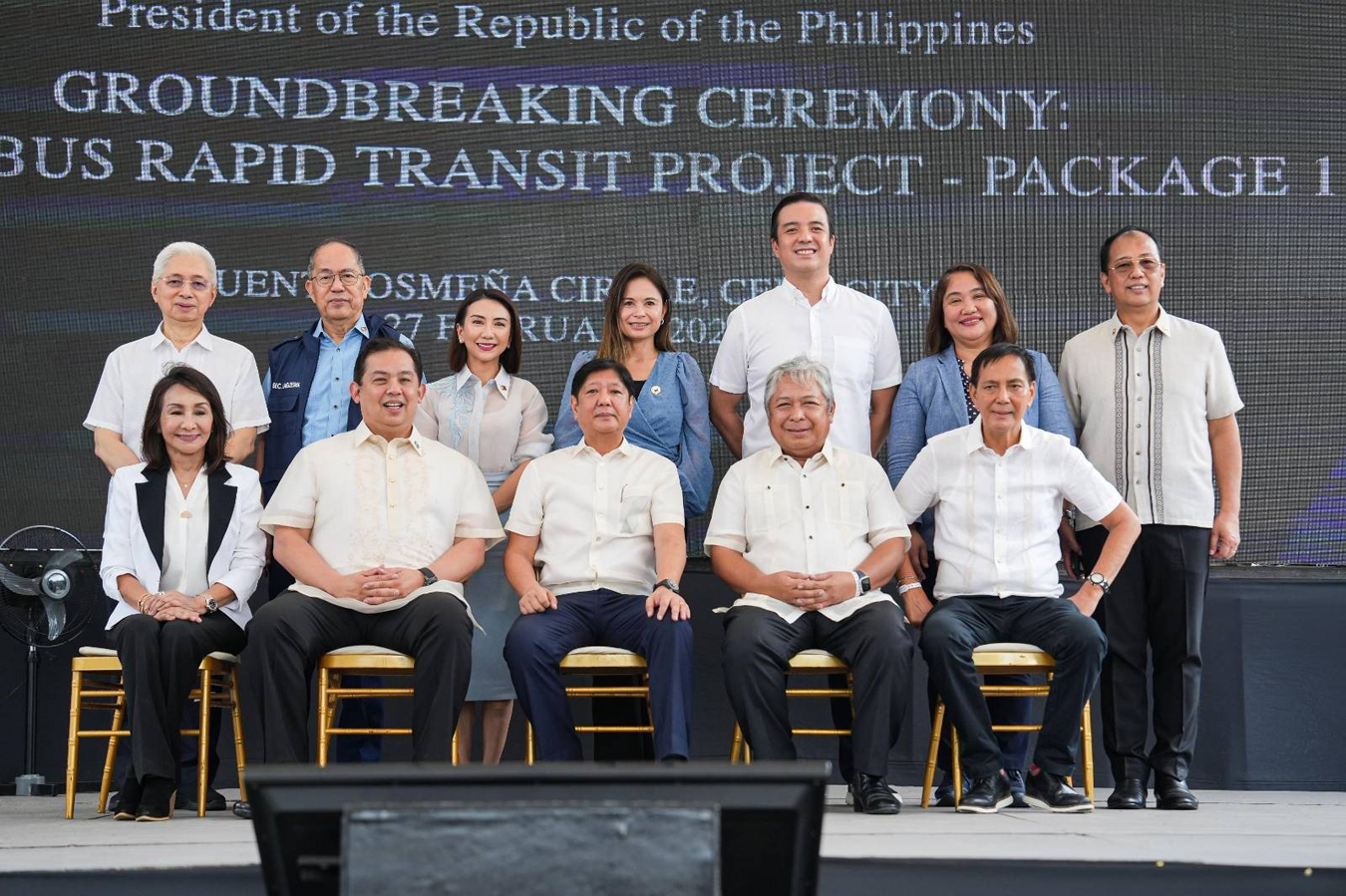
Rama in 2023 (standing, third from right) with President Bongbong Marcos, House Speaker Martin Romualdez, Cebu Gov. Gwen Garcia, Mayor Mike Rama, Cebu City Rep. Cutie del Mar, and other national and local officials.

From late 2022 to early 2023, Rama and Negros Occidental 6th District Rep. Mercedes Alvarez-Lansang co-led a technical working group for the creation of the Negros Island Region (NIR). Rama and Alvarez were involved in consultations and the creation of a consolidated bill that would re-unify the provinces of Negros Occidental (then under Region 6) and Negros Oriental (then under Region 7) into a single region, as well the province of Siquijor (formerly under Negros Oriental).

Rama was one of 18 representatives who joined Deputy Speaker and former President Gloria Macapagal Arroyo in filing House Resolution No. 780 on February 15, 2023 in defense of former President Duterte against the investigation by the International Criminal Court (ICC). The resolution was unsuccessful and remained pending with the House Committee on Justice until its expiration at the end of the 19th Congress. Duterte was eventually arrested two years later on March 11, 2025, becoming the first Philippine president to face an international tribunal and the first Asian leader to be arrested by the ICC for crimes against humanity.

On May 7, 2023, Rama launched the Cong. Edu Rama Softball Cup in partnership with Converge ICT, targeting softball enthusiasts in the South District. The softball cup took place at the Labangon Elementary School grounds, spanning four weeks and featuring eight teams, with PHP 10,000 (USD 180) awarded to the winning team.

Amid Mayor Mike Rama's dispute with the Metropolitan Cebu Water District (MCWD) and its chairperson Jose "Joey" Daluz III, himself a former city councilor and BARUG member, Mike Rama revealed that he had spoken with Edu Rama and Rep. Del Mar in an attempt to secure intervention from Congress.

Rama expressed his support for Mike Rama following the latter's preventive suspension by the Ombudsman on May 8, 2024. In a May 20 statement, Rama posted that he stood "with Cebu City Mayor Michael ‘Mike’ Lopez Rama amidst the circumstances that he currently faces."

On September 24, 2024, Mike Rama announced BARUG's lineup for the 2025 elections under the "Partido BARUG BagOng Sugbo — Team Rama" coalition. They filed their candidacies on October 3, with Mike Rama running for mayor, Hontiveros for vice mayor, Edu Rama running for re-election as 2nd (South) district representative, and Mike's son (and Edu's cousin) Mikel Rama running for city councilor. On the same day, the Ombudsman released its September 19 ruling on Mike Rama's case, dismissing the suspended mayor from his position and permanently disqualifying him from public office. This resulted in vice mayor and Acting Mayor Garcia fully assuming the office of mayor, following succession laws.

Despite Partido Barug and Garcia's KUSUG fielding opposing lineups for the 2025 elections, Rama was endorsed by KUSUG as its congressional candidate in South District. In February 2025, Rama expressed his appreciation for KUSUG's endorsement, while also issuing a clarification that he continued to be a member of BARUG, following what a PhilSTAR report described as some confusion among South District voters due to Rama appearing on both parties' campaign materials.

On January 30, 2025, Rama and Department of Education (DepEd) Secretary Sonny Angara led the groundbreaking ceremony for a PHP 700 million (USD 11.98 million) 12-storey school building on the grounds of the Don Vicente Rama Memorial National High School in Basak San Nicolas, Cebu City. Rama lobbied the national government for the project, which he claimed was the first medium-rise public school building in the Philippines. The school is named after Rama's paternal great-grandfather, Senator Vicente Rama.

Rama, now a member of Lakas-CMD headed by Speaker Martin Romualdez since 2023, signed the impeachment complaint against Vice President Sara Duterte on February 5, 2025, becoming one of the 9 representatives to do so out of a total of 11 Cebuano lawmakers. Rama's uncle, dismissed Mayor Mike Rama, disagreed with his nephew's decision to sign the impeachment complaint. Regardless, he reiterated his support for the younger Rama on March 1, despite cutting ties with Tingog Partylist over the issue. Vice President Duterte nonetheless continued to campaign for BARUG and its lineup of candidates during her visits to Cebu City, while notably omitting any mention of Edu Rama.

==== Second congressional term ====
Following the elections on May 12, 2025, Rama was re-elected as Congressman despite criticism of his support for Sara Duterte's impeachment, defeating former Rep. Abellanosa by winning 181,055 votes (57.89%) to Abellanosa's 131,723 votes—a margin of 15.78 percent, and Rama's highest number and share of votes so far.

Rama took his oath of office for his second term on May 30 along with the rest of the winning candidates from BARUG at a ceremony spearheaded by former Mayor Mike Rama, with the oaths administered by Basak San Nicolas Barangay Captain Norman Navarro, Tagbao Barangay Captain Ana Tabal, Bonbon Barangay Captain Grace Mabano Duragos, and Suba Barangay Captain Emerson Sable. He also attended the ceremonial oathtaking of winning candidates from KUSUG on July 28 along with several other officials from BARUG, sparking rumors of a renewed alliance between BARUG and KUSUG; both blocs eventually formed a 12-member supermajority, finalized during the inaugural session of the 17th Sangguniang Panlungsod on July 8, 2025.

House Spokesperson Princess Abante revealed on June 7 that Rama was one of 8 representatives from Central Visayas who joined a caucus with Romualdez and signed a manifesto of support for his re-election as Speaker in the 20th Congress, in response to Deputy Speaker and Cebu 5th District Rep. Duke Frasco withholding his support. As a result, Frasco was expelled by his party, the National Unity Party (NUP).

On June 30, 2025, the first day of his second term, Rama immediately filed ten house bills, numbered H.B. 530 through 539. These bills focused on freedom of information, benefits for barangay day care workers, standardized salaries and retirement benefits for barangay officials, benefits for private health workers, food stamps, salary increases for public school teachers, visas for digital nomads, community service for littering, establishing a Kidney Institute of Cebu, and improving the Magna Carta for Public Social Workers.

On July 30, 2025, Rama was named as a House Deputy Majority Leader for the 20th Congress by House Majority Leader Sandro Marcos through the Committee on Rules, along with 20 other lawmakers.

==== House legislative record ====
According to the House of Representatives' Legislative Information System (LEGIS), Rama is listed as the principal author of 149 House Bills and Resolutions during the 19th Congress (2022–2025).

Rama was also involved in passing the following Republic Acts as principal author, as reported by the House's congressional record and local news sources:

Republic Acts principally authored by Eduardo R. Rama Jr.
Republic Act (House Bill)	Short title	Long title	Date Enacted	Ref
R.A. 11962 (HB 8400)	Trabaho Para Sa Bayan Act	An Act Establishing the National Employment Master Plan, to Be Known as the "Trabaho Para Sa Bayan Plan," Appropriating Funds Therefor, and for Other Purposes	September 27, 2023	
R.A. 11984 (HB 7584)	No Permit, No Exam Prohibition Act	An Act Mandating Public and Private Educational Institutions to Allow Disadvantaged Students With Unpaid Tuition and Other School Fees to Take the Periodic and Final Examinations and for Other Purposes	March 11, 2024	
R.A. 11997 (HB 9682)	Kabalikat sa Pagtuturo Act	An Act Institutionalizing the Grant of a Teaching Allowance for Public School Teachers and Appropriating Funds Therefor	May 31, 2024	
R.A. 12028 (HB 8210)	Academic Recovery And Accessible Learning (Aral) Program Act	An Act Establishing an Academic Recovery and Accessible Learning (Aral) Program and Appropriating Funds Therefor	October 16, 2024	

Additionally, Rama was also listed as principal author of the following House Resolutions of local significance to Cebu City and Cebu Province during the 19th Congress:

House Resolutions principally authored by Eduardo R. Rama Jr.
Resolution	Long title	Date Adopted	Ref
HR 21 (Filed as HR 88 and 458)	Resolution Congratulating and Commending the Tribu Lumad Basakanon of Barangay Basak, San Nicolas, Cebu City for Winning the gold medal in the International Category of the Powerful Daegu Festival 2022 in Daegu City, South Korea	November 8, 2022	
HR 157 (Filed as HR 725 and 1322)	Resolution Congratulating Andrew Lorenz Caunan Cabigon and Matthew Andrei Go for Winning Gold Medals in the International Junior Math Olympiad Held Last December 4, 2022 in Singapore	January 26, 2023	
HR 187 (Filed as HR 1293)	A Resolution Extending Heartfelt and Sincere Congratulations to Archiglobal Inc. For Winning the 2023 Best Architecture Design Firm and Best Commercial Building Architecture Design Awards at the 2023 Asia Architecture Design Awards.	September 13, 2023	

The following are among some of the unsuccessful House Bills Rama filed during the 19th Congress, all of either local significance to Cebu City and Cebu Province, or claimed by Rama among his notable legislative work. All these bills remained pending until the end of the term, most at the committee level:

- HB 961 — Metropolitan Cebu Development Authority Act, filed July 1, 2022;
- HB 2768 — Kidney Institute of Cebu Act, filed on July 29, 2022;
- HB 2769 (national) — Shark Conservation Act of the Philippines, filed on July 29, 2022; substituted by HB 8586 which remained pending with the Senate;
- HB 3347 (substituted by HB 6914) — Upgrading Cebu Technological University into the Cebu Technological University System, filed on August 8, 2022, remained pending with the Senate;
- HB 6682 (national) — E-Governance Act of 2022, filed on January 24, 2023;
- HB 6883 (national) — Magna Carta of Day Care Workers, filed on January 24, 2023;
- HB 9072 — Renaming Bitlang Integrated School in Sudlon, Cebu City to Sudlon 1 Integrated School, filed on September 6, 2023;
- HB 9765 — Converting F. Vestil Street in Mambaling, Cebu City and the South Road Properties into a national road, filed December 13, 2023;

===== Lack of local laws for Cebu City =====
A March 24, 2024 SunStar Cebu column by Pachico Seares noted that both Rama and his 1st (North) District counterpart, Rachel del Mar, had not yet passed any local laws specifically for Cebu City, despite filing what Seares described as numerous House Bills in the 19th Congress. The laws passed by both Representatives were primarily national in scope, authored along with dozens, if not hundreds of other legislators. Seares attributed this to the slow pace of national legislation, which causes most House Bills to be stuck until the end of the term and re-filed when a new Congress begins.

== Controversies ==
=== COVID-19 pandemic chicken donations ===
At the height of the COVID-19 pandemic in 2020, Rama, Councilor Raymond Alvin Garcia, and former Labella assistant and councilor Eugenio Faelnar were sued before the Ombudsman for the alleged illegal selling of over 17,000 chickens donated as food aid for the most-affected areas of the city. The case was dismissed by the Ombudsman on May 11, 2023 on the grounds of insufficient evidence.

== Electoral history ==
As of 2025, Rama ran and won in a total of eight elections. More detailed lists of candidates and votes in each election may be found in the respective election's article.

Electoral history of Eduardo R. Rama Jr.
Year	Office Constituency	Party (Note: Filipino local politicians more commonly campaign in their constituencies based on local parties and alliances, rather than on their national parties. It is also common for local parties and alliances to switch affiliations to another national party, especially following the election of a new President.)		Main opponent (Note: The listed main opponent is either the victorious candidate (in an election defeat) or the second-ranked candidate (in a victory). No main opponent is listed for positions with multiple officeholders, e.g. City Councilor.)		Votes for Rama					Result	Ref
Year	Office Constituency	Local	National	Name	Party	Total	%	±%	Mgn. (Note: For offices with only one winner (e.g. Mayor), margins shown are over the main or winning opponent. For offices with multiple winners (e.g. City Council), margins shown are over the highest-ranked losing candidate.)	P. (Note: The top 8 candidates for the Cebu City Council in each district are elected. All 16 councilors are ranked based on how much votes they each got compared to all other councilors, rather than on their rankings within their district. In contrast, only the 1st-ranked candidate for Mayor, Vice Mayor, and Representative posts wins.)	Result	Ref
2004	City Councilor; Cebu City—2nd	BOPK	Lakas-CMD	—N/a		103,997	—N/a	—N/a	—N/a	2nd	Won	
2007	City Councilor; Cebu City—2nd	BOPK	Lakas-CMD	—N/a		—N/a	—N/a	—N/a	—N/a	—N/a	Won	
2010	City Councilor; Cebu City—2nd	BOPK	Liberal	—N/a		121,340	9.14%	—N/a	4.24%	3rd	Won	
2013	Term-limited as city councilor, did not run (Note: In 2012, then-Mayor Mike Rama bolted BOPK to form his own party, Team Rama, which was eventually renamed Partido Barug. While Edu Rama did not run for office in 2013, he joined his uncle (Mike) in changing political affiliations.)											
2016	City Councilor; Cebu City—2nd	BARUG	UNA	—N/a		139,498	7.50%	-1.64%	1.98%	3rd	Won	
2019	City Councilor; Cebu City—2nd	BARUG	PDP-Laban	—N/a		141,716	7.32%	-0.18%	1.58%	3rd	Won	
2022	Representative; Cebu City—2nd	BARUG	PDP-Laban	BG Abellanosa	BOPK	168,476	54.42%	— (Note: 2022 vote percentage non-comparable to previous election due to running for a position with a single officeholder (Representative) after previously running for a position with multiple officeholders (City Councilor).)	8.78%	1st	Won	
2025	Representative; Cebu City—2nd	BARUG	Lakas-CMD	Rodrigo Abellanosa	BOPK	181,055	57.89%	+3.47%	15.78%	1st	Won	

== Personal life ==
Rama is married to Georgia Felice "Jaja" Chiongbian-Rama, who he knew since their childhood. They have three children together. Chiongbian-Rama, a public relations and marketing executive, previously served as Cebu City Tourism Commissioner. The couple enjoy watching movies and series marathons in their free time, share an dislike for vegetables and fruits, and are licensed for open-water scuba diving.

Both of Rama's parents come from notable political families; on his father's side, he is a member of the Rama family of Cebu, which include his uncle former Cebu City Mayor Mike Rama and cousin City Councilor Mikel Rama. His paternal grandfather was Cebu City Councilor Fernando G. Rama, son of Senator Vicente Rama. Like many members of the Rama family, Rama resides in Barangay Basak San Nicolas, Cebu City. On his mother's side, his grandparents were Misamis Oriental Governor and Representative Pedro "Oloy" Neri Roa Sr. and Cagayan de Oro Representative Benedicta Cabañez Bacan-Roa.

Rama is also known for his love of sports, as reported by SunStar Cebu. and often loves spending time with his kids.

== Ancestry ==
Ancestors of Eduardo Roa Rama Jr.

16. Gabriel "Abi" Raffiñan y Buzón
8. Vicente Rama
17. Engilberta "Iya Bita" Ramas y Enguio
4. Fernando G. Rama
9. Catalina A. Genson
2. Eduardo L. Rama Sr.
5. Natividad Lopez
1. Eduardo R. Rama Jr.
24. Pedro R. Roa
12. Antonio C. Roa
25. Luciana Velez Chaves
6. Pedro N. Roa, Sr.
26. Filomeno Tan Neri
13. Mauricia B. Neri
27. Fermina Laid Baculio
3. Thelma B. Roa
14. Apolonio Bacan
7. Benedicta C. Bacan
15. Ubalda Cabañez

== Honors and awards ==
Rama is a recipient of the following honors and awards:

- Mayor's Special Award, given by then-Mayor Mike Rama during the city's 87th Charter Day celebration on February 22, 2024;

== See also ==
- List of people from Cebu
- Cebu City's 2nd congressional district
- List of members of the House of Representatives of the Philippines (R)
- Cebu City Council

House of Representatives of the Philippines
Preceded by Rodrigo Abellanosa	Member of the House of Representatives from Cebu City's 2nd (South) District; 2022–present	Incumbent
