= Cuenco =

Cuenco is a surname. Notable people with the surname include:

- Cuenco family
- Antonio Cuenco (born 1936), Filipino politician
- Ernani Cuenco (1936–1988), Filipino composer
- José María Cuenco (1885–1972), Filipino Archbishop
- Juliet Cuenco, Filipino-Canadian rights activist
- Mariano Jesús Cuenco (1888–1964), Filipino politician and writer
- Monica Cuenco (born 1994), Filipino singers
- Rey Cuenco (1960–1996), Filipino basketball player
