= Nancy Cuenco =

Filipino former politician (born 1941)

Member of the Philippine House of Representatives from Cebu City's 2nd district
- In office June 30, 1998 – June 30, 2001
- Preceded by: Antonio Cuenco
- Succeeded by: Antonio Cuenco

Personal details
- Born: Nancy Garde Roa; January 14, 1941 (age 85)
- Party: BOPK (local; 1997–2001); PROMDI (national; 1997–2001)
- Spouse: Antonio Cuenco (died 2020)
- Children: 4, including James Anthony and Ronald
- Relatives: Cuenco family
- Profession: Zoologist

Nancy Roa Cuenco (born January 14, 1941) is a Filipino zoologist and former politician. She served as Representative from the 2nd (South) District of Cebu City from 1998 to 2001.

Cuenco was born on January 14, 1941 to Benjamin Roa Sr. and Alicia Garde. She was married to former Cebu City 2nd district representative Antonio "Tony" Cuenco, with whom she has four children, namely former Cebu City 2nd (South) District Councilors James Anthony and Ronald, Antonio Jr., and Cynthia Cuenco-Dizon.

After her husband Antonio was term-limited after serving for three terms from 1987 to 1998, Cuenco succeeded him for a single three-year term in Congress, in line with a common practice by Filipino political dynasties of fielding "bench-warmer" relatives to temporarily occupy a term-limited member's position. In 2001, Antonio ran for his old post, serving for another three terms until 2010.

Cuenco's husband Antonio died on June 27, 2020 from COVID-19.

House of Representatives of the Philippines
Preceded by Antonio Cuenco	Member of the House of Representatives from Cebu City's 2nd (South) District; 1998–2001	Succeeded by Antonio Cuenco
