= List of members of the House of Representatives of the Philippines (R) =

This is a complete list of past and present members of the House of Representatives of the Philippines whose last names begin with the letter R.

This list also includes members of the Philippine Assembly (1907–1916), the Commonwealth National Assembly (1935–1941), the Second Republic National Assembly (1943–1944) and the Batasang Pambansa (1978–1986).

== Ra ==
- Merced Edith Rabat, member for Davao Oriental (1984–1986)
- Aileen Radaza, member for Lapu-Lapu City (2013–2019)
- Arturo Radaza, member for Lapu-Lapu City (2010–2013)
- Paz Radaza, member for Lapu-Lapu City (2019–2022)
- Miguel Raffiñan, member for Cebu's 6th district (1916–1922, 1931–1934, 1938–1941)
- Nicolas Rafols, member for Cebu's 6th district (1922–1925, 1928–1931, 1934–1938, 1945–1949)
- Eduardo Rama Sr., member for Agusan del Norte's 2nd district (1995–1998)
- Eduardo Rama Jr., member for Cebu City's 2nd district (2022–present)
- Vicente Rama, member for Cebu's 3rd district (1922–1928, 1934–1935), and Cebu's 4th district (1935–1938)
- Ulpiano Ramas, member for Region IX (1978–1984)
- Jose Ramirez, member for Eastern Samar (1987–1998)
- Marcelo Ramirez, member for Bohol's 2nd district (1928–1934)
- Herminia Ramiro, member for Misamis Occidental's 2nd district (1995–1998, 2001–2010)
- Hilarion Ramiro Jr., member for Misamis Occidental's 2nd district (1987–1995, 1998–2001)
- Agustin Ramos, member for Negros Occidental's 3rd district (1934–1935)
- Anacleto Ramos, member for Pangasinan's 1st district (1935–1941)
- Bernardita Ramos, member for Sorsogon's 2nd district (2019–2020)
- Deogracias Ramos Jr., member for Sorsogon's 2nd district (2010–2019)
- Godofredo Ramos, member for Capiz's 3rd district (1949–1957), and Aklan (1961–1965)
- Narciso Ramos, member for Pangasinan's 5th district (1934–1941, 1945–1946)
- Rafael Ramos, member for Negros Occidental's 3rd district (1909–1912), and Sorsogon (1943–1944)
- Simeon Ramos, member for Ilocos Sur's 1st district (1925–1928)
- Feliciano Ramoso, member for Nueva Ecija (1925–1928)
- Matias Ranillo, member for Zamboanga (1945–1946)
- Ireneo Ranjo, member for Ilocos Norte's 1st district (1922–1925)
- Marcial Rañola, member for Albay's 3rd district (1945–1949)
- Antonio Raquiza, member for Ilocos Norte's 1st district (1949–1967), Region I (1978–1984), and Ilocos Norte (1984–1986)
- Gulamu Rasul, member for Sulu (1938–1941, 1943–1944, 1949–1950)
- Adelisa Raymundo, sectoral member (1987–1992)
- Ciriaco Razul, member for Lanao (1943–1944)

== Re ==
- Isidro Real Jr., member for Zamboanga del Sur (1984–1986), and Zamboanga del Sur's 1st district (1987–1992, 2001–2007)
- Alfonso Recto, member for Tayabas's 1st district (1916–1919)
- Claro M. Recto, member for Batangas's 3rd district (1919–1928)
- Rafael Recto, member for Batangas (1984–1986)
- Ralph Recto, member for Batangas's 4th district (1992–2001), and Batangas's 6th district (2022–2024)
- Ryan Recto, member for Batangas's 6th district (2025–present)
- Henry Regalado, member for Region X (1978–1984), and Misamis Occidental (1984–1986)
- Celso Regencia, member for Iligan (2022–present)
- Rene Relampagos, member for Bohol's 1st district (2010–2019)
- Prudencio Remigio, member for Manila's 2nd district (1931–1934)
- Crispin Diego Remulla, member for Cavite's 7th district (2023–present)
- Gilbert Remulla, member for Cavite's 2nd district (2001–2007)
- Jesus Crispin Remulla, member for Cavite's 3rd district (2004–2010), and Cavite's 7th district (2010–2013, 2019–2022)
- Santiago Respicio, member for Isabela's 3rd district (1987–1998)
- Zafiro Respicio, member for Davao City (1984–1986)
- Bartolome Revilla, member for Rizal's 2nd district (1907–1909)
- Bryan Revilla, member for Agimat party-list (2022–present)
- Jolo Revilla, member for Cavite's 1st district (2022–present)
- Juan Johnny Revilla, member for OFW party-list (2013–2016)
- Strike Revilla, member for Cavite's 2nd district (2016–2022)
- Margarito Revilles, member for Bohol's 3rd district (1934–1938, 1945–1946)
- Manuel Rey, member for Ambos Camarines's 2nd district (1907–1909, 1916–1919)
- Agusto Reyes, member for Cavite (1925)
- Alberto Reyes, member for Ilocos Sur's 1st district (1914–1919)
- Allan Benedict Reyes, member for Quezon City's 3rd district (2019–2022)
- Angelito Reyes, member for Taguig's 2nd district (2010)
- Benito Reyes, member for Batangas's 3rd district (1916–1919)
- Carmencita Reyes, member for Region IV-A (1978–1984), and Marinduque (1984–1986, 1987–1998, 2007–2010)
- Deogracias Reyes, member for Pangasinan's 2nd district (1907–1909)
- Edmundo Reyes Jr., member for Marinduque (1998–2007)
- Fidel Reyes, member for Batangas's 3rd district (1912–1916)
- Francisco Reyes, member for Manila's 1st district (1969–1972)
- Godofredo Reyes, member for Ilocos Sur's 2nd district (1958–1961)
- Hermogenes Reyes, member for Bulacan's 1st district (1909–1912)
- Jaime Reyes, member for Camarines Sur's 1st district (1945–1946)
- Jesus Reyes, member for Pangasinan's 5th district (1965–1969)
- Jose M. Reyes, member for Capiz's 3rd district (1946–1949)
- Juan M. Reyes, member for Capiz's 3rd district (1938–1941, 1945–1946)
- Juan S. Reyes, member for Sorsogon's 1st district (1925–1928)
- Ramon M. Reyes, member for Isabela's 3rd district (1998–2001)
- Ray T. Reyes, member for Anakalusugan party-list (2022–present)
- Regina Reyes, member for Marinduque (2013–2016)
- Samuel Reyes, member for Isabela (1949–1957)
- Victoria Reyes, member for Batangas's 3rd district (2001–2010)
- Alfonso Reyno Jr., member for Cagayan (1984–1986)

== Ri ==
- Timoteo Ricohermoso, member for Marinduque (1946–1949)
- Terry Ridon, member for Kabataan party-list (2013–2016), and Bicol Saro party-list (2025–present)
- Marvin Rillo, member for Quezon City's 4th district (2022–2025)
- Miguel Rilloraza Jr., member for La Union's 1st district (1949–1953)
- Enrique Rimando, member for La Union's 2nd district (1934–1935, 1945–1946)
- Bong Rivera, member for Tarlac's 3rd district (2022–present)
- Cayetano Rivera, member for Tarlac's 2nd district (1916–1919)
- Domingo Rivera, member for CIBAC party-list (2019–2022)
- Michael Angelo Rivera, member for 1 CARE party-list (2010–2016)
- Vicente Rivera Jr., member for Bulacan's 2nd district (1987–1992)
- Rodolfo Rivilla, member for Leyte's 4th district (1969–1972)

== Ro ==
- Benedicta Roa, member for Cagayan de Oro (1987–1992)
- Cristina Roa-Puno, member for Antipolo's 1st district (2016–2019)
- Arthur Robes, member for San Jose del Monte (2007–2016, 2025–present)
- Florida Robes, member for San Jose del Monte (2016–2025)
- Jose Robles Jr., member for Nueva Ecija's 1st district (1934–1935)
- Virgilio Robles, member for Caloocan (1984–1986), and Caloocan's 1st district (1987–1992)
- Leni Robredo, member for Camarines Sur's 3rd district (2013–2016)
- Ramon Rocamora, member for Siquijor (2016–2019)
- Joaquin Roces, member for Manila's 2nd district (1953–1972)
- Miles Roces, member for Manila's 3rd district (2004–2007)
- Antonio Rocha, member for Sorsogon's 1st district (1922–1925)
- Angel Roco, member for Albay's 2nd district (1907–1909)
- Sulpicio Roco Jr., member for Camarines Sur's 2nd district (2001–2004)
- Raul Roco, member for Camarines Sur's 2nd district (1987–1992)
- Adelina Rodriguez-Zaldarriaga, member for Rizal's 2nd district (2007–2010)
- Buenaventura Rodriguez, member for Cebu's 1st district (1931–1934), and Cebu's 7th district (1934–1935)
- Celestino Rodriguez, member for Cebu's 1st district (1907–1912, 1935–1938, 1945–1946)
- Eulogio Rodriguez, member for Nueva Vizcaya (1924–1925), and Rizal's 2nd district (1925–1928, 1931–1935)
- Eulogio Rodriguez Jr., member for Rizal's 1st district (1949–1957)
- Isidro Rodriguez Jr., member for Rizal's 2nd district (1998–2007, 2010–2019)
- Jose Rodriguez, member for Cebu's 7th district (1945–1949)
- Julian Rodriguez. member for Mindanao and Sulu (1934–1935)
- Leo Rodriguez, member for Catanduanes (2019–present)
- Maximo Rodriguez Jr., member for Abante Mindanao party-list (2010–2016, 2025–present), and Cagayan de Oro's 2nd district (2016–2019)
- Oscar Samson Rodriguez, member for Pampanga's 3rd district (1987–1992, 1995–2004, 2013–2016)
- Pedro Rodríguez, member for Cebu's 7th district (1907–1909)
- Rufus Rodriguez, member for Cagayan de Oro's 2nd district (2007–2016, 2019–present)
- Manuel Rojas, member for Cavite (1938–1941, 1949–1953)
- Dennis Roldan, member for Quezon City's 3rd district (1992–1995)
- Ernesto Roldan, member for Region XII (1978–1984)
- Antonino Roman, member for Region III (1978–1984), Bataan (1984–1986), and Bataan's 1st district (1998–2007)
- Geraldine Roman, member for Bataan's 1st district (2016–2025)
- Herminia Roman, member for Bataan's 1st district (2007–2016)
- Pablo Roman, member for Bataan (1965–1972)
- Antonino Roman III, member for Bataan's 1st district (2025–present)
- Guillermo Romarate Jr., member for Surigao del Norte's 2nd district (2007–2016)
- José E. Romero, member for Negros Oriental's 2nd district (1931–1941, 1945–1946)
- Mikee Romero, member for 1-Pacman party-list (2016–present)
- Miguel Romero, member for Negros Oriental's 2nd district (1987–1998)
- Alfred Romualdez, member for Leyte's 1st district (1998–2001)
- Andrew Julian Romualdez, member for Tingog party-list (2025–present)
- Benjamin Romualdez, member for Region VIII (1978–1984), and Leyte (1984–1986)
- Daniel Z. Romualdez, member for Leyte's 4th district (1949–1961), and Leyte's 1st district (1961–1965)
- Martin Romualdez, member for Leyte's 1st district (2007–2016, 2019–present)
- Miguel Romualdez, member for Leyte's 3rd district (1912–1916)
- Norberto Romualdez, member for Leyte's 4th district (1935–1941)
- Yedda Marie Romualdez, member for Leyte's 1st district (2016–2019), and Tingog party-list (2019–2025, 2025–present)
- Jurdin Jesus Romualdo, member for Camiguin (1998–2007, 2022–present)
- Pedro Romualdo, member for Camiguin (1987–1998, 2010–2013)
- Xavier Jesus Romualdo, member for Camiguin (2013–2022)
- Alberto Romulo, member for Quezon City (1984–1986)
- Carlos P. Romulo, member for Region IV (1978–1983)
- Roman Romulo, member for Pasig (2007–2016, 2019–present)
- Jose Roño, member for Region VIII (1978–1984), Samar (1984–1986), and Samar's 1st district (1987–1992)
- Florante Roque, member for Bulacan's 1st district (1946–1953)
- Harry Roque, member for Kabayan party-list (2016–2017)
- Laarni Roque, member for Bukidnon's 4th district (2022–present)
- Norberto Roque, member for Sorsogon's 1st district (1935–1941, 1945–1946)
- Rogelio Neil Roque, member for Bukidnon's 4th district (2013–2022)
- Eduardo Roquero, member for San Jose del Monte (2004–2007)
- Decoroso Rosales, member for Samar's 1st district (1945–1946)
- Etta Rosales, member for Akbayan party-list (1998–2007)
- Honorio Rosales, member for Samar's 1st district (1907–1909)
- Leopoldo Rovira, member for Negros Oriental's 1st district (1907–1909), and Negros Oriental's 2nd district (1914–1916)
- Gerardo Roxas, member for Capiz's 1st district (1957–1965)
- Gerardo Roxas Jr., member for Capiz's 1st district (1987–1993)
- Jose Antonio Roxas, member for Pasay (2007–2010)
- Manuel Roxas, member for Capiz's 1st district (1922–1938)
- Mar Roxas, member for Capiz's 1st district (1993–2000)
- Nicanor Roxas, member for Rizal (1943–1944)
- Jose Roy, member for Tarlac's 1st district (1946–1961)
- Jorge Royeca, member for Region XI (1978–1984)

== Ru ==
- Emi Rubiano, member for Pasay (2010–2019)
- Antonio Rubin, member for Bukidnon (1943–1944)
- Conrado Rubio, member for Ilocos Norte (1943–1944), and Ilocos Norte's 2nd district (1945–1946)
- Alejandro Ruiz, member for Cebu's 4th district (1907–1919)
- Nicomedes Rupisan, member for Pangasinan's 4th district (1935–1941)
- Emilio Rustia, member for Bulacan (1943–1944)
