= Manuel A. Cuenco =

Filipino politician, Governor of Cebu (1946–1951), Secretary of Health (1964–1965)

The Honorable Manuel A. Cuenco
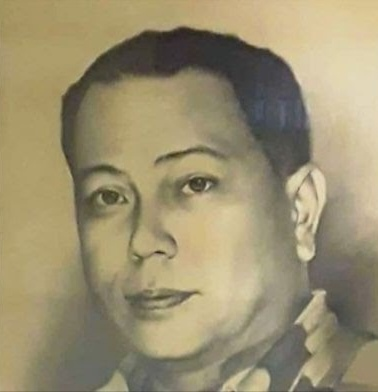

14th Governor of Cebu
- In office 1946–1951
- Preceded by: Fructuoso B. Cabahug
- Succeeded by: Sergio S. Osmeña Jr.

Administrator of Overseas Employment Council
- In office 1962–1963

13th Secretary of Health
- In office 1964–1965
- President: Diosdado Macapagal
- Preceded by: Floro Dabu
- Succeeded by: Paulino Garcia

Personal details
- Born: Manuel Alesna Cuenco; November 10, 1907 Cebu, Philippine Islands
- Died: October 18, 1970 (aged 62) Cebu, Philippines
- Party: Liberal
- Spouse: Milagros Veloso
- Relations: Miguel Cuenco (uncle)
- Children: 6, including Antonio
- Parents: Mariano Jesús Cuenco; Filomena Alesna
- Profession: Physician

Manuel Alesna Cuenco (November 10, 1907 – October 18, 1970) was a Filipino physician and politician from Cebu, Philippines. He was the former Governor of Cebu (1946–1951), administrator of the Overseas Employment Council, and the Secretary of Health (1964–1965).

== Early life and education ==
The son of Filipino politician Mariano Jesús Cuenco and Filomena Alesna, Manuel Cuenco was born on November 10, 1907. He finished medicine at the University of Santo Tomas. He and his wife Milagros Veloso had six children, including Antonio Cuenco who later would become a congressman. The family escaped from the war and avoided Japanese forces by evacuating to remote locations like the towns of Sibonga in Cebu, Talibon in Bohol, and Hilongos and Macrohon in Leyte.

== Career ==
Before the outbreak of the war, he worked as company physician for the Cebu Portland Cement Company in Naga, Cebu, a government-owned-and-controlled company that was later privatized.

After World War II in 1946, then President Manuel Roxas appointed him as Governor of the province of Cebu. The next year, he was reelected as a Liberal Party candidate for another term. In 1951, he was defeated by Sergio Osmeña Jr. in his bid to be elected again as governor and the electoral protest he filed on the outcome of the 1951 election before the Court of First Instance against Osmeña was dismissed on September 4, 1954.

He was appointed on June 18, 1962 as administrator of economic coordination, and was soon appointed as the administrator of Overseas Employment Council from 1962 until 1963. Later, he was appointed as the Secretary of Health from December 1964 to December 1965. His appointment to the Cabinet of then President Diosdado Macapagal was the result of the alliance between otherwise local political rivals, the Osmeña and the Cuenco clans. The alliance was formed against the reelection of Carlos P. Garcia, whom Macapagal defeated in the 1961 elections.

== Later years ==
He died on October 18, 1970.

== Historical commemoration ==
- Governor M. Cuenco Avenue that stretches from Archbishop Reyes Avenue to the Mahiga Bridge was named in his honor by virtue of City Ordinance No. 869.
