= Miguel Cuenco =

Filipino Visayan lawyer, journalist, and legislator from Cebu, Philippines

The Honourable Miguel Diosomito Cuenco
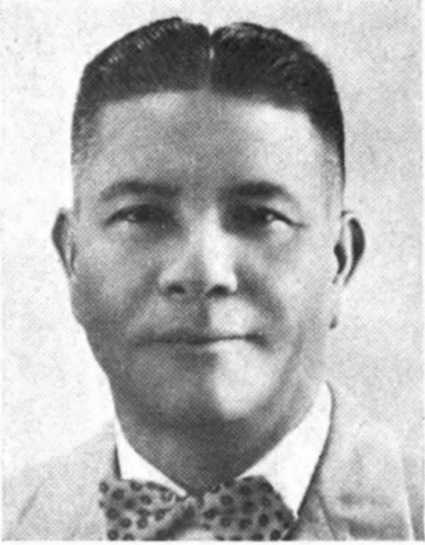
- Cuenco official portrait during the 3rd Congress

Member of the House of Representatives from Cebu's 5th district Member of the National Assembly (1935–1941)
- In office June 2, 1931 – December 30, 1941
- Preceded by: Tomas Noel Alonzo
- Succeeded by: Leandro A. Tojong
- In office December 30, 1949 – December 30, 1965
- Preceded by: Leandro A. Tojong
- Succeeded by: Antonio V. Cuenco

Personal details
- Born: December 15, 1904 Sogod, Cebu, Philippine Islands
- Died: June 30, 1990 (aged 85) Philippines
- Party: Nacionalista
- Relations: Jose Maria Cuenco (brother); Mariano Jesus Cuenco (brother); Manuel Cuenco (nephew)
- Parents: Mariano Albao Cuenco; Remedios Diosomito
- Education: Colegio de San Carlos; University of Santo Tomas; Yale University; Harvard University; Georgetown University
- Profession: Lawyer; Journalist

Miguel Diosomito Cuenco (December 15, 1904 – June 30, 1990) was a Filipino Visayan lawyer, journalist, and legislator from Cebu, Philippines. Except the years from 1941 to 1945 (dissolution during the Second Philippine Republic) and from 1946 to 1949, he served as member of the Lower House of Congress representing the 5th legislative district of Cebu from 1935 to 1965.

== Early life ==
Miguel Cuenco was born to the couple Mariano Albao Cuenco of Sogod, Cebu and Remedios Lopez Diosomito of Baybay, Leyte on December 15, 1904. His siblings were Jose Ma. Cuenco, the first Archbishop of Jaro, Iloilo, and former Senate President Mariano Jesus Cuenco.

== Education ==
Acquiring a Liberal Arts degree at the Colegio de San Carlos when he was 14 years old, he was involved in various student activities, won prizes in philosophy and oratorical contests, and recognized for his writing skills in the Spanish language. He earned a law degree from the University of Santo Tomas at the age of 18 and became a lawyer on November 16, 1926. At the University of Santo Tomas, he was an editor of school papers Revista Escolar de Derecho and Unitas.

He pursued further studies in the United States, attending Yale University, Harvard University and Georgetown University in Washington, D.C., where he took Diplomacy and International Relations.

Miguel Cuenco married Fara Remia Jalbuena Ledesma on May 27, 1948. The couple had three children, but only their daughter Marietta survived to adulthood.

== Journalism ==
At a young age, he was an editor for La Juventud, a Spanish newspaper. He also became a reporter and editor of El Precursor, a Cebu periodical founded by election lawyer Domingo Franco and whose management would be taken over later on to his brother, Mariano.

== Legal education ==
He also was a professor of political law at the University of San Carlos and later became the dean of the College of Law. Before the war, he was appointed by the Supreme Court as member of the committee responsible for amending the Code of Legal Ethics by the recommendation of Jose P. Laurel.

== Political career ==
When Sergio Osmeña retired from politics after his defeat in the 1946 presidential election, the Cuenco family took political hold in the locality by allying themselves with Manuel Roxas, the newly elected president, as well as a local political leader named Ramon Durano. The Cuencos did not have large landholdings, but they had commercial interests in Cebu City and owned Bisaya Land Transportation Company, one of only two major land transportation companies at that time. The Osmeñas and Cuencos later established alliance in 1954 to 1955, a political fusion that Miguel hesitated to join for quite some time.

Affiliated with the Nacionalista Party, Miguel Cuenco was elected member of the Philippine Legislature for two terms representing the 5th legislative district of Cebu in 1931 to 1935, succeeding his brother Mariano Jesus Cuenco. He was again voted to serve in the same elected post for the 1st National Assembly and the 2nd National Assembly during the Commonwealth period from 1935 to 1941. Before the outbreak of World War II in 1941, he was again reelected but only served after the war in 1945. After the war, he was voted again as Congressman of the Cebu's 5th district for four terms starting in 1950 until 1965.

As legislator in the Lower House of Congress, he authored the Republic Act 709, a law approved on June 5, 1952, and that required the mandatory teaching of Spanish language in colleges and universities. He was Chairman on the Committee on Elections from 1931 until 1935, Chairman of the Committee on Public Works from 1934 to 1945, Chairman of the Committee on Foreign Affairs, and member of the following committees: on Revision of Laws, and on Labor and Industrial Relations. In April 1954, he was part of the Philippine delegation to the Geneva International Conference. However, he declined the offers of President Manuel Roxas and later President Elpidio Quirino for diplomatic posts for the United States, United Nations, Spain, Rome or Shanghai.

== Business ==
In addition, Miguel Cuenco was a business executive, working as Vice President of the Bisaya Land Transportation Company Inc and the manager of the company's shipping department. The company was wholly owned by Filipino and engaged in transportation and shipping in the Visayas and Mindanao.

In 1958, he filed a complaint against Dioscoro Lazaro, Manuel Cuenco, Jose P. Velez, Jesus P. Velez, Federico A. Reyes, and Nicolas Jumapao for an article published on The Republic Daily, a Cebu newspaper of which Lazaro was the publisher, that reported Cuenco was sued by the company for issues allegedly involving the company's management. The case was dismissed by the Supreme Court on March 31, 1976.

The Supreme Court also ruled a separate case involving the assets of Bisaya Land Transportation, stating that Cuenco's rights to the assets only arise upon the dissolution of the company.

== Later years ==
On December 17, 1965, he announced his retirement from politics . He had received various awards, including recognition from the Legislative Press Club, Philippine Women Voter's League, and University of San Carlos (distinguished alumnus).

He was 86 when he died on June 30, 1990.

== Historical commemoration ==
- A statue was erected in his honor in the plaza of Alegria, Cebu.
