= Cebu Technological University =

Public university in Cebu City, Philippines

- Teknolohikal nga Unbersidad sa Sugbo (Cebuano)
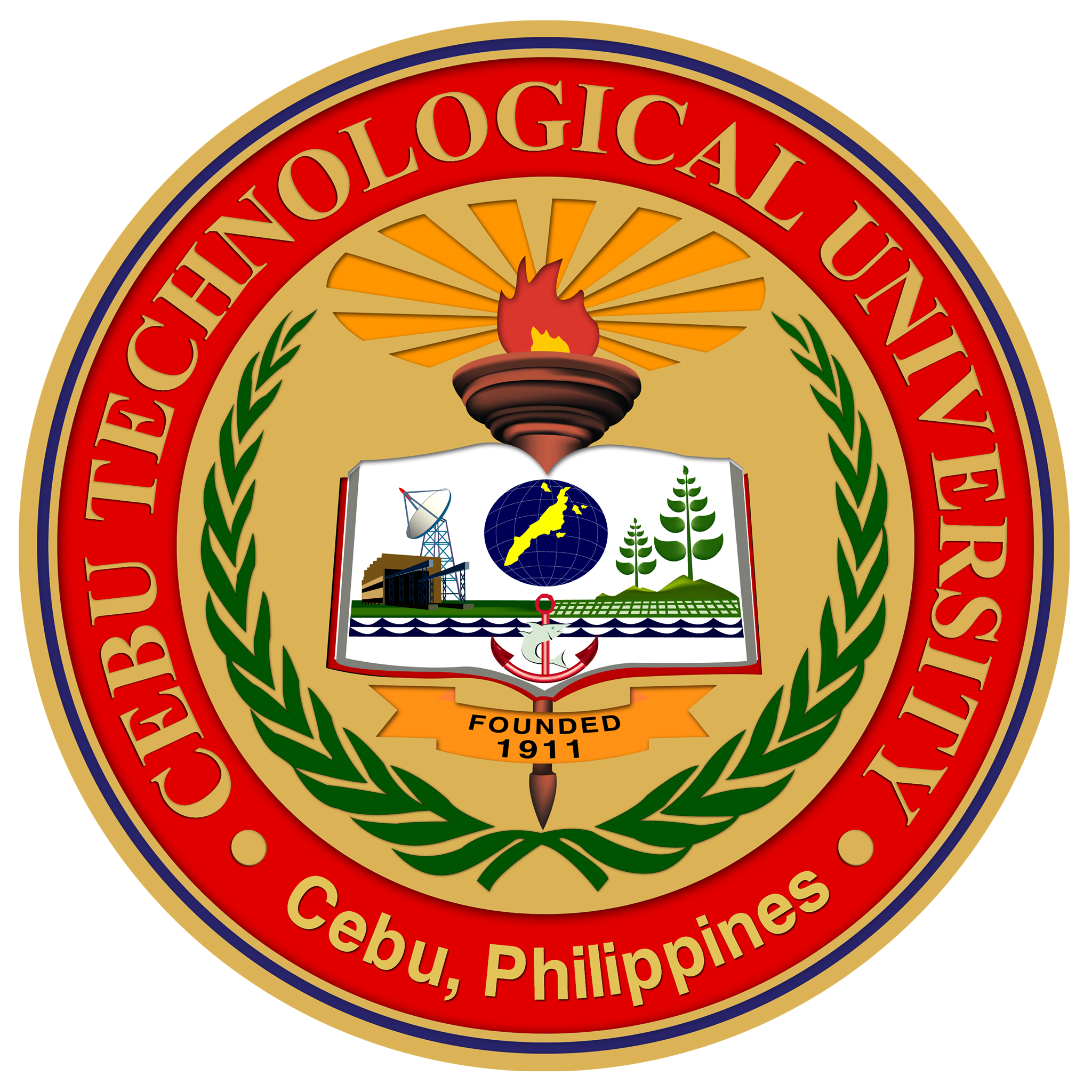
- Official seal
- Former names: Cebu Trade School (1911–1940); Cebu School of Arts and Trades (1940–1983); Cebu State College of Science and Technology (1983–2009)
- Type: Public research basic higher education institution
- Established: 1901 (as the Manual Arts department of Cebu Normal School; 1911 (as Cebu Trade School)
- Accreditation: AACCUP ISO 9001:2015 Quacquarelli Symonds
- Religious affiliation: Non-sectarian
- Budget: ₱2.508 billion (2025)
- Chairman: Dr. Shirley C. Agrupis
- President: Dr. Jonita V. Literatus (OIC)
- Academic staff: 922 (S.Y. 2025–26)
- Students: 80,872 (S.Y. 2025–26)
- Location: M.J. Cuenco Avenue corner R. Palma Street, Cebu City, Cebu, Philippines; 10°17′48″N 123°54′23″E
- Campus: 2.8 ha (6.9 acres); Urban
- Demonym: Technologist
- University Hymn: CTU Hymn
- Colors: Red Grey Gold
- Nickname: Technologist
- Sporting affiliations: NCAF, SCUAA, Angara Cup
- Mascot: N/A
- Website: www.ctu.edu.ph
- Location in the Visayas Location in the Philippines

Cebu Technological University (Cebuano: Teknolohikal nga Unbersidad sa Sugbo), abbreviated as CTU and also known as CebuTech, is a public state-funded higher education institution located in Cebu, Philippines. CTU was originally a part of the Philippine public high school system and traces its roots to the Manual Arts department of the Cebu Normal School (now the Cebu Normal University), and was founded independently in 1911 as the Cebu Trade School. In 1928, the institution opened its own campus near the Port of Cebu, where its main campus still stands today.

The university, since its founding in 1911, was also previously known as Cebu Trade School, Cebu School of Arts and Trades, and Cebu State College of Science and Technology, until, in 2009, by the virtue of Republic Act 9744, it was converted into a state university, and assuming the name Cebu Technological University.

The CTU system comprises 29 campuses: one main campus in Cebu City, 16 satellite campuses, and 12 extension campuses. As of school year 2025–26, there are 80 538 students enrolled on the 29 CTU campuses located throughout the province of Cebu.

Cebu Technological University (CTU) continues to achieve significant milestones in academic excellence, innovation, and internationalization. The university ranked 2nd in Cebu and 17th nationwide in the January 2026 Webometrics Ranking, reflecting its growing global presence in research and education. CTU also expanded its international reach by securing four recipients in the 2026–2027 Canada-ASEAN SEED Scholarship Program, while earning national recognition from the Intellectual Property Office of the Philippines as the 2025 Top Utility Model Filer and Top Utility Model Agent. These accomplishments highlight CTU's commitment to producing globally competitive graduates, advancing research and innovation, and strengthening its position as one of the country's leading state universities.

== History ==
=== Brief History and Profile ===
The Cebu Technological University (CTU) traces its beginnings to 1901, originating as the Manual Arts department of the Cebu Normal School, initially known as the Cebu Trade School, as highlighted in Figure 1. When the Cebu Normal School phased out its Secondary Normal Curriculum, the Cebu Trade School was considered for integration with the Cebu Provincial High School across the street, now the site of Abellana National High School along Osmeña Boulevard (formerly Jones Avenue).

By 1911, the Cebu Trade School became independent, establishing its own facilities and appointing two American and three Filipino teachers to handle grades five, six, and seven. Its first intermediate trade graduates completed their studies in 1912 under the leadership of Mr. Jose P. Sevilla, the first principal (1911–1913).

In subsequent years, the school relocated to its current site on Los Martires Street, now Don Mariano Jesus Cuenco Avenue, under Proclamation No. 180 dated August 20, 1928. It transitioned to offering secondary trade education under the stewardship of principals like Mr. Pantaleon C. Regara (1932–1935), Mr. Pedro Catuncan (1935–1938), and Mr. Esteban Lugue (1938–1940). Renamed the Cebu School of Arts and Trades (CSAT) in 1940 under Commonwealth Act No. 313, the institution embraced its role as a National School of Arts and Trades, introducing technical courses amidst the looming threat of World War II.

=== Wartime Challenges and Post-War Rehabilitation ===
During the tenure of Mr. Gregorio J. Sevilla, the fifth principal, World War II severely disrupted operations, with campus buildings burned and students displaced. CSAT reopened on August 1, 1945, using a temporary facility—a warehouse owned by Mr. Carlos Quisumbing at the corner of General Maxilom and General Echavez Streets. Classes resumed at the Los Martires campus on January 1, 1947, after the site was vacated by American Liberation Forces. However, post-war Cebu's instability culminated in the tragic assassination of Superintendent Sevilla on January 3, 1948.

=== Expansion and Academic Growth ===
Under Superintendent Tranquilino de los Trinos (1949–1951), CSAT became coeducational in 1950, introducing secondary courses and specialized two-year programs such as the Teacher Arts and Trades and Trade Technical Education curricula. Successive leaders, including Mr. Efinito S. Cruz (1951– 1957) and Mr. Ricardo P. Trinidad (1957–1962), further expanded educational offerings.

During Mr. Marcelo S. Bonilla’s tenure (1962–1970), CSAT gained prominence in trade-technical education. Republic Act No. 3742 in 1963, which established the Bureau of Vocational Education (BVE), integrated CSAT into this new entity, separating it from the Bureau of Public Schools. By 1969, CSAT began offering graduate programs, such as the Master of Education (M.Ed.) degree.

=== Transition to Cebu State College of Science and Technology (CSCST) ===
The transformation of CSAT into CSCST began under Superintendent Dr. Atanacio P. Elma (1975–1983), who later became its first president in 1985. Dr. Elma oversaw substantial infrastructure projects, such as administrative, canteen, and science buildings, and supported faculty scholarships both locally and internationally, shaping CSCST into a leading institution.

=== Establishment of CTU and Advancements ===
In 2009, CSCST attained university status, becoming Cebu Technological University (CTU) under the leadership of Dr. Bonifacio S. Villanueva. This period saw a significant rise in enrollment, the establishment of new extension campuses, and thriving academic programs. Dr. Villanueva’s tenure laid a foundation of robust academic and infrastructure development.

Subsequent leadership, including that of Dr. Rosein A. Ancheta Jr.,further elevated CTU’s standing. Under Dr. Ancheta, CTU achieved a three-star overall rating from Quacquarelli Symonds (QS) Stars in 2020, reflecting its global competitiveness. His initiatives in infrastructure, internationalization, and academic mobility aligned CTU with global standards, fostering a culture of innovation and excellence.

With the leadership of the new president, Dr. Joseph C. Pepito, CTU is guided by his commitment to education, innovation, and public service, anchored in his principle: "Upholding public interest over and above personal interest is a quintessential imposition." He emphasizes that as a premier, multi-disciplinary and technological university, CTU must foster strong partnerships with the government, community organizations, research institutions, and industry partners—both local and international—while continuously enhancing higher education standards to create an environment where students can thrive.

=== Integration into a state college ===
By virtue of Batas Pambansa Bilang 412 on June 10, 1983, CSAT, along with nine other local public schools around the province of Cebu, were integrated into a new state college system, to be called the Cebu State College of Science and Technology (CSCST). It was mandated that the new state college "shall expand its curricular programs focusing on higher technological education". The integrated local colleges include:

- Cebu School of Arts and Trades in Cebu City
- Sudlon Agricultural College in Lahug, Cebu City
- Abellana National School in Cebu City
- Danao Vocational School in Danao
- Tuburan Vocational School in Tuburan
- Moalboal School of Fisheries in Moalboal
- Argao Agro-Industrial School in Argao
- Quirino School of Fisheries in Carmen
- Manuel A. Roxas Memorial School of Fisheries in Daanbantayan
- Magsaysay School of Fisheries in San Francisco, Camotes Islands

On December 16, 2003, to fully standardize and to highly institutionalize the entire management of its educational system, Cebu State College of Science and Technology was granted Certificate of Registration by Anglo-Japanese American (AJA) Registrars Incorporated in accordance with ISO 9001:2000 Quality Management System Standards, with Certification No. AJA 03/6952 giving it international recognition. On October 8, 2009, the CSCST's QMS was recertified compliant to the new version, ISO 9001:2008 standards by the Anglo-Japanese American (AJA) Registrars Inc., and on November 26, 2018, the university QMS earned its certification of the ISO 9001:2015 standards by the TUV Rheinland.

=== University status and global competitiveness ===
By virtue of Republic Act No. 9744, CSCST eventually became a state university on November 10, 2009, and adopting its current name Cebu Technological University (CTU).

In 2020, CTU became the first university in Cebu to be awarded an overall rating of three stars by global higher education analyst Quacquarelli Symonds (QS) Stars team, following CTU being one of the grantees of the Philippine Philippine Commission on Higher Education (CHED) program of “Fostering World Class Philippines Universities Project” in July 2019. The following year, in 2021, CTU was ranked in the 651+ bracket of the Quacquarelli Symonds (QS) Asian University Rankings for 2022., and was also given reporter status in the Times Higher Education World University Rankings.

== Campuses ==
The Cebu Technological University system has 29 campuses spread throughout Cebu. It consists of one (1) main campus in Cebu City, nine (17) satellite campuses, and thirteen (12) extension campuses.

=== Main ===
- CTU Main (Cebu City)

=== Satellite ===
- CTU Argao
- CTU Asturias
- CTU Balamban
- CTU Barili
- CTU Borbon
- CTU Carmen
- CTU Cebu Mountain Satellite Campus
- CTU Consolacion
- CTU Daanbantayan
- CTU Danao
- CTU Liloan
- CTU Moalboal
- CTU Pinamungajan
- CTU Tuburan
- CTU San Francisco
- CTU Toledo

=== Extension ===
- CTU Bantayan
- CTU Dumanjug
- CTU Ginatilan
- CTU Guba
- CTU Malabuyoc
- CTU Naga
- CTU Oslob
- CTU San Fernando
- CTU San Remigio
- CTU Tabogon
- CTU Tabuelan
- CTU Sogod

== Administration ==
The President of Cebu Technological University is selected and appointed by the Board of Regents/Trustees, upon the recommendation of a search committee. The current president is Dr. Jonita V. Literatus(OIC)

The Board of Regents (BOR) is the governing board of the university as mandated by law. The administration of Cebu Technological University and the exercise of its corporate powers are vested in the Board of Regents and the President of the university.

=== Academics ===
Cebu Technological University offers undergraduate degree programs, graduate programs, special programs, and online programs. These programs are offered in the following colleges of the university:

- College of Arts and Sciences (CAS)
- College of Information and Communications Technology (CCICT)
- College of Education (CoEd)
- College of Engineering (CoE)
- College of Management and Entrepreneurship (CME)
- College of Technology (CoT)
- College of Education, Arts and Sciences(CEAS)
- College of Technology, Management, and Entrepreneurship (CTME)
- College of Business Management (CBM)
- College of Technology and Engineering (COTE)
- College of Agriculture, Forestry and Environment (CAFE)
- College of Hospitality Management and Tourism (CHMT)
- College of Agriculture, Food Science, Business, and Communication (CAFBC)
- College of Veterinary Medicine (CVM)
- College of Technology Management (CTM)
- Institute of Agricultural Biosystems Engineering (IABE)
- College of Agriculture (CA)
- College of Maritime Education (CME)
- College of Fisheries and Allied Sciences (CFAS)
- College of Agribusiness (CAB)

In addition to these colleges, CTU, in consortium with the Cebu City Medical Center, also has an affiliated nursing school, the Cebu Technological University–Cebu City Medical Center (CTU–CCMC) College of Nursing located along D. Jakosalem Street, Cebu City, located not far from the CTU main campus.

== Admissions and financial aid ==
=== Admission ===
Admission to CTU is selective. All aspiring students, except for BS Nursing applicants, must take and pass the CTU Entrance Exam. Admission to selected programs is based on test scores, availability of slots, and the student's grade point average in senior high school. Applicants must also have not obtained any failing grade in the academic year prior to admission, with the exception of degree programs aimed towards persons with disabilities. The Admissions Office of Cebu Technological University caters to student-applicants interested in enrolling in the university upon submission of their course and grade requirements and after passing the admission test and interview. Admission tests are administered before the start of the academic year. The university also adopts laws, rules, regulations, and policies of Republic Act No. 9165, also known as the Comprehensive Dangerous Drugs Act of 2002.

BS Nursing is offered through CTU–CCMC College of Nursing, an affiliated school of CTU. As CTU–CCMC is affiliated with Cebu City Medical Center, which is owned by the Cebu City local government, admission is only open for residents or children of registered voters of Cebu City. In addition, applicants must have had not obtained any failing grade in the academic year prior to admission.

In school year 2020–21, CTU admitted a total of 18,145 freshmen students throughout all of its campuses, of which 4,880 were admitted in its main campus in Cebu City.

=== Tuition and scholarship ===
Cebu Technological University provides free tuition fee through Republic Act No. 10931, also known as the Universal Access to Quality Tertiary Education Act signed in 2017. The university also provides assistance to qualified students through internal and externally funded scholarships.
