= Antonio Cuenco =

Filipino politician (1936–2020)

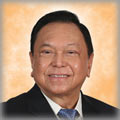
- Official portrait, 2007

Speaker pro tempore of the House of Representatives of the Philippines
- In office July 27, 1987 – June 30, 1992
- Preceded by: Macacuna Dimaporo (as speaker pro tempore of the Batasang Pambansa)
- Succeeded by: Raul Daza

Member of the Philippine House of Representatives
- In office June 30, 2001 – June 30, 2010
- Preceded by: Nancy Roa Cuenco
- Succeeded by: Vacant (post later held by Tomas Osmeña)
- In office June 30, 1987 – June 30, 1998
- Preceded by: District created
- Succeeded by: Nancy Roa Cuenco
- Constituency: Cebu City's 2nd district
- In office December 30, 1965 – December 30, 1969
- Preceded by: Miguel Cuenco
- Succeeded by: Emerito S. Calderon
- Constituency: Cebu's 5th district

Member of Parliament from Cebu City
- In office June 30, 1984 – March 25, 1986 Serving with Marcelo Fernan

Member of the Cebu City Council from the 2nd district
- In office June 30, 2019 – June 27, 2020

Secretary-General of the ASEAN Inter-Parliamentary Assembly
- In office February 4, 2010 – February 4, 2013
- Preceded by: Mohammad Yusof Zain
- Succeeded by: Periowsamy Otharam

Personal details
- Born: March 26, 1936 Cebu, Commonwealth of the Philippines
- Died: June 27, 2020 (aged 84) Cebu City, Philippines
- Party: PDP–Laban (2019–2020)
- Other political affiliations: Lakas (1992–2019); LnB–Panaghiusa (1987–1992); UNIDO (1984–1986); Liberal (1965–1984)
- Spouse: Nancy Roa Cuenco
- Children: 4, including James Anthony and Ronald
- Relatives: Cuenco family
- Education: Ateneo de Manila University (AB, LLB)
- Profession: Lawyer

Antonio "Tony" Veloso Cuenco (March 26, 1936 – June 27, 2020) was a Filipino politician who served as a council member for the 2nd district of the Cebu City Council. He also served as the Secretary-General of the ASEAN Inter-Parliamentary Assembly (AIPA) from 2010 to 2013 and as representative of Cebu City's 2nd congressional district in the House of Representatives from 1987 to 1998 and 2001 to 2010. Cuenco was the first speaker pro tempore of the House after the chamber's reestablishment in 1987.

== Personal life ==
Born on March 26, 1936 to a well-known family in Cebu, the Cuenco family, "Tony" was the son of former Gov. Manuel Cuenco and Milagros Veloso-Cuenco, the grandnephew of former representative Miguel Cuenco, and the grandson of former Senate President Mariano Cuenco. He was married to former congresswoman Nancy Roa-Cuenco with four children; Cebu City councilors James Anthony Cuenco and Ronald Cuenco, Antonio Cuenco, Jr., and Cynthia Cuenco-Dizon.

He spent his secondary education in Ateneo de Cagayan, and received his Bachelor of Arts and Bachelor of Law degrees from Ateneo de Manila University.

== Political career ==
At 29 years old, Cuenco was one of the youngest congressmen elected during the 6th Congress, serving from 1965 to 1969 representing Cebu's 5th congressional district. He had also been a member of Regular Batasang Pambansa from 1984 to 1986, and the reestablished House of Representatives from 1987 to 1998, now representing Cebu City's 2nd district. He was elected during the 8th Congress as speaker pro tempore.

After his wife's term in 2001, he ran anew for Cebu City's 2nd congressional district. Since then, he represented the city in Congress from 2001 to 2010 through the 12th to 14th Congresses. His term ended on June 30, 2010, and was succeeded by Tomas Osmeña.

Cuenco ran for, and won a seat in the Cebu City Council during the 2019 elections, placing 4th with 140,139 votes.

== Death ==
On June 27, 2020, Cuenco died due to the effects of COVID-19 during the COVID-19 pandemic in the Philippines as confirmed by his son, former Cebu City Councilor James Anthony Cuenco. The younger Cuenco said that his father experienced "mild fever and incessant coughing" on June 18 which prompted them to conduct a swab test and later showed on June 20 that the elder Cuenco was positive from the said virus.

House of Representatives of the Philippines
Preceded by Macacuna Dimaporo (as speaker pro tempore of the Batasang Pambansa)	Speaker pro tempore of the House of Representatives of the Philippines; 1987–1998	Succeeded by Raul Daza
Preceded by Nancy Cuenco	Member of the Philippine House of Representatives from Cebu City's 2nd district 2001–2010 (1987–1998)	Succeeded by Tomas Osmeña
New district	Member of the Philippine House of Representatives from Cebu City's 2nd district 2001–2010 (1987–1998)	Succeeded by Nancy Cuenco
