= Cebu City's 2nd congressional district =

Legislative district of the Philippines

- Constituency for the House of Representatives of the Philippines
- Boundary of Cebu City's 2nd congressional district in Cebu City

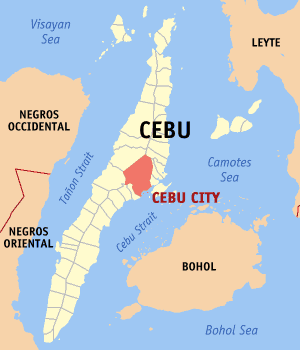
- Location of Cebu City within Cebu
- City: Cebu City
- Region: Central Visayas
- Population: 526,512 (2015)
- Electorate: 384,031 (2019)
- Major settlements: 34 barangays: Barangays; Babag; Basak Pardo; Basak San Nicolas; Bonbon; Buhisan; Bulacao; Buot; Calamba; Cogon Pardo; Duljo Fatima; Guadalupe; Inayawan; Kalunasan; Kinasang‑an Pardo; Labangon; Mambaling; Pahina San Nicolas; Pamutan; Pasil; Poblacion Pardo; Pung-ol Sibugay; Punta Princesa; Quiot; San Nicolas Proper; Sapangdaku; Sawang Calero; Sinsin; Suba; Sudlon I; Sudlon II; Tabunan; Tagbao; Tisa; Toong

Current constituency
- Created: 1987
- Representative: Eduardo Rama Jr.
- Political party: Lakas
- Congressional bloc: Majority

Cebu City's 2nd congressional district is one of the two congressional districts of the Philippines in the city of Cebu. It has been represented in the House of Representatives of the Philippines since 1987. The district consists of thirty four barangays of the city locally referred to as the "South District". It is currently represented in the 20th Congress by Eduardo Rama Jr. of the Lakas–CMD.

== Representation history ==
#	Image	Member	Term of office		Legislature	Party	Electoral history	Constituent LGUs
#	Image	Member	Start	End	Legislature	Party	Electoral history	Constituent LGUs
=== Cebu City's 2nd district for the House of Representatives of the Philippines ===
District created February 2, 1987.
1		Antonio V. Cuenco	June 30, 1987	June 30, 1998	8th	LnB; Local: Panaghiusa	Elected in 1987.	1987–present Babag, Basak Pardo, Basak San Nicolas, Bonbon, Buhisan, Bulacao, Buot, Calamba, Cogon Pardo, Duljo Fatima, Guadalupe, Inayawan, Kalunasan, Kinasang-an Pardo, Labangon, Mambaling, Pahina San Nicolas, Pamutan, Pasil, Poblacion Pardo, Pung-ol Sibugay, Punta Princesa, Quiot, San Nicolas Proper, Sapangdaku, Sawang Calero, Sinsin, Suba, Sudlon I, Sudlon II, Tabunan, Tagbao, Tisa, Toong
1		Antonio V. Cuenco	June 30, 1987	June 30, 1998	9th	LnB; Local: Panaghiusa	Re-elected in 1992.	1987–present Babag, Basak Pardo, Basak San Nicolas, Bonbon, Buhisan, Bulacao, Buot, Calamba, Cogon Pardo, Duljo Fatima, Guadalupe, Inayawan, Kalunasan, Kinasang-an Pardo, Labangon, Mambaling, Pahina San Nicolas, Pamutan, Pasil, Poblacion Pardo, Pung-ol Sibugay, Punta Princesa, Quiot, San Nicolas Proper, Sapangdaku, Sawang Calero, Sinsin, Suba, Sudlon I, Sudlon II, Tabunan, Tagbao, Tisa, Toong
1		Antonio V. Cuenco	June 30, 1987	June 30, 1998	10th	Lakas; Local: BOPK	Re-elected in 1995.	1987–present Babag, Basak Pardo, Basak San Nicolas, Bonbon, Buhisan, Bulacao, Buot, Calamba, Cogon Pardo, Duljo Fatima, Guadalupe, Inayawan, Kalunasan, Kinasang-an Pardo, Labangon, Mambaling, Pahina San Nicolas, Pamutan, Pasil, Poblacion Pardo, Pung-ol Sibugay, Punta Princesa, Quiot, San Nicolas Proper, Sapangdaku, Sawang Calero, Sinsin, Suba, Sudlon I, Sudlon II, Tabunan, Tagbao, Tisa, Toong
2		Nancy R. Cuenco	June 30, 1998	June 30, 2001	11th	PROMDI; Local: BOPK	Elected in 1998.	1987–present Babag, Basak Pardo, Basak San Nicolas, Bonbon, Buhisan, Bulacao, Buot, Calamba, Cogon Pardo, Duljo Fatima, Guadalupe, Inayawan, Kalunasan, Kinasang-an Pardo, Labangon, Mambaling, Pahina San Nicolas, Pamutan, Pasil, Poblacion Pardo, Pung-ol Sibugay, Punta Princesa, Quiot, San Nicolas Proper, Sapangdaku, Sawang Calero, Sinsin, Suba, Sudlon I, Sudlon II, Tabunan, Tagbao, Tisa, Toong
(1)		Antonio V. Cuenco	June 30, 2001	June 30, 2010	12th	Lakas; Local: BOPK	Elected in 2001.	1987–present Babag, Basak Pardo, Basak San Nicolas, Bonbon, Buhisan, Bulacao, Buot, Calamba, Cogon Pardo, Duljo Fatima, Guadalupe, Inayawan, Kalunasan, Kinasang-an Pardo, Labangon, Mambaling, Pahina San Nicolas, Pamutan, Pasil, Poblacion Pardo, Pung-ol Sibugay, Punta Princesa, Quiot, San Nicolas Proper, Sapangdaku, Sawang Calero, Sinsin, Suba, Sudlon I, Sudlon II, Tabunan, Tagbao, Tisa, Toong
(1)		Antonio V. Cuenco	June 30, 2001	June 30, 2010	13th	Lakas; Local: BOPK	Re-elected in 2004.	1987–present Babag, Basak Pardo, Basak San Nicolas, Bonbon, Buhisan, Bulacao, Buot, Calamba, Cogon Pardo, Duljo Fatima, Guadalupe, Inayawan, Kalunasan, Kinasang-an Pardo, Labangon, Mambaling, Pahina San Nicolas, Pamutan, Pasil, Poblacion Pardo, Pung-ol Sibugay, Punta Princesa, Quiot, San Nicolas Proper, Sapangdaku, Sawang Calero, Sinsin, Suba, Sudlon I, Sudlon II, Tabunan, Tagbao, Tisa, Toong
(1)		Antonio V. Cuenco	June 30, 2001	June 30, 2010	14th	Lakas; Local: BOPK	Re-elected in 2007.	1987–present Babag, Basak Pardo, Basak San Nicolas, Bonbon, Buhisan, Bulacao, Buot, Calamba, Cogon Pardo, Duljo Fatima, Guadalupe, Inayawan, Kalunasan, Kinasang-an Pardo, Labangon, Mambaling, Pahina San Nicolas, Pamutan, Pasil, Poblacion Pardo, Pung-ol Sibugay, Punta Princesa, Quiot, San Nicolas Proper, Sapangdaku, Sawang Calero, Sinsin, Suba, Sudlon I, Sudlon II, Tabunan, Tagbao, Tisa, Toong
3		Tomas R. Osmeña	June 30, 2010	June 30, 2013	15th	Liberal; Local: BOPK	Elected in 2010.	1987–present Babag, Basak Pardo, Basak San Nicolas, Bonbon, Buhisan, Bulacao, Buot, Calamba, Cogon Pardo, Duljo Fatima, Guadalupe, Inayawan, Kalunasan, Kinasang-an Pardo, Labangon, Mambaling, Pahina San Nicolas, Pamutan, Pasil, Poblacion Pardo, Pung-ol Sibugay, Punta Princesa, Quiot, San Nicolas Proper, Sapangdaku, Sawang Calero, Sinsin, Suba, Sudlon I, Sudlon II, Tabunan, Tagbao, Tisa, Toong
4		Rodrigo A. Abellanosa	June 30, 2013	June 30, 2022	16th	Liberal; Local: BOPK	Elected in 2013.	1987–present Babag, Basak Pardo, Basak San Nicolas, Bonbon, Buhisan, Bulacao, Buot, Calamba, Cogon Pardo, Duljo Fatima, Guadalupe, Inayawan, Kalunasan, Kinasang-an Pardo, Labangon, Mambaling, Pahina San Nicolas, Pamutan, Pasil, Poblacion Pardo, Pung-ol Sibugay, Punta Princesa, Quiot, San Nicolas Proper, Sapangdaku, Sawang Calero, Sinsin, Suba, Sudlon I, Sudlon II, Tabunan, Tagbao, Tisa, Toong
4		Rodrigo A. Abellanosa	June 30, 2013	June 30, 2022	17th	Liberal; Local: BOPK	Re-elected in 2016.	1987–present Babag, Basak Pardo, Basak San Nicolas, Bonbon, Buhisan, Bulacao, Buot, Calamba, Cogon Pardo, Duljo Fatima, Guadalupe, Inayawan, Kalunasan, Kinasang-an Pardo, Labangon, Mambaling, Pahina San Nicolas, Pamutan, Pasil, Poblacion Pardo, Pung-ol Sibugay, Punta Princesa, Quiot, San Nicolas Proper, Sapangdaku, Sawang Calero, Sinsin, Suba, Sudlon I, Sudlon II, Tabunan, Tagbao, Tisa, Toong
4		Rodrigo A. Abellanosa	June 30, 2013	June 30, 2022	18th	LDP; Local: BOPK	Re-elected in 2019.	1987–present Babag, Basak Pardo, Basak San Nicolas, Bonbon, Buhisan, Bulacao, Buot, Calamba, Cogon Pardo, Duljo Fatima, Guadalupe, Inayawan, Kalunasan, Kinasang-an Pardo, Labangon, Mambaling, Pahina San Nicolas, Pamutan, Pasil, Poblacion Pardo, Pung-ol Sibugay, Punta Princesa, Quiot, San Nicolas Proper, Sapangdaku, Sawang Calero, Sinsin, Suba, Sudlon I, Sudlon II, Tabunan, Tagbao, Tisa, Toong
5		Eduardo R. Rama Jr.	June 30, 2022	Incumbent	19th	Lakas; Local: BARUG	Elected in 2022.	1987–present Babag, Basak Pardo, Basak San Nicolas, Bonbon, Buhisan, Bulacao, Buot, Calamba, Cogon Pardo, Duljo Fatima, Guadalupe, Inayawan, Kalunasan, Kinasang-an Pardo, Labangon, Mambaling, Pahina San Nicolas, Pamutan, Pasil, Poblacion Pardo, Pung-ol Sibugay, Punta Princesa, Quiot, San Nicolas Proper, Sapangdaku, Sawang Calero, Sinsin, Suba, Sudlon I, Sudlon II, Tabunan, Tagbao, Tisa, Toong
5		Eduardo R. Rama Jr.	June 30, 2022	Incumbent	20th	Lakas; Local: BARUG	Re-elected in 2025.	1987–present Babag, Basak Pardo, Basak San Nicolas, Bonbon, Buhisan, Bulacao, Buot, Calamba, Cogon Pardo, Duljo Fatima, Guadalupe, Inayawan, Kalunasan, Kinasang-an Pardo, Labangon, Mambaling, Pahina San Nicolas, Pamutan, Pasil, Poblacion Pardo, Pung-ol Sibugay, Punta Princesa, Quiot, San Nicolas Proper, Sapangdaku, Sawang Calero, Sinsin, Suba, Sudlon I, Sudlon II, Tabunan, Tagbao, Tisa, Toong

== Election results ==
=== 2025 ===
2025 Philippine House of Representatives election in the 2nd District of Cebu City
Party	Candidate	Votes	%
Lakas	Eduardo Rama Jr. (incumbent)	181,055	57.89
Independent	Rodrigo Abellanosa	131,723	42.11
Total votes		312,778	100%
Margin of victory		49,332	15.78
Lakas hold			

=== 2022 ===
2022 Philippine House of Representatives election in the 2nd District of Cebu City
Party	Candidate	Votes	%
PDP–Laban	Eduardo Rama Jr.	168,476	54.42%
LDP	BG Rodrigo Abellanosa	141,076	45.57%
Total votes		288,715	100%
Margin of victory		25,615	8.78%

=== 2019 ===
2019 Philippine House of Representatives election in the 2nd District of Cebu City
Party	Candidate	Votes	%
LDP	Rodrigo Abellanosa (incumbent)	163,752	61.22
PDP–Laban	Jocelyn Pesquera	103,717	38.78
Total votes		267,469	100.00
Margin of victory		60,035	22.44
LDP hold			

=== 2016 ===
2016 Philippine House of Representatives election in the 2nd District of Cebu City
Party	Candidate	Votes	%
Liberal	Rodrigo Abellanosa (incumbent)	148,838	59.26
UNA	Gerardo Carillo	97,293	38.74
Independent	Lea Ong	5,013	2.00
Total votes		251,144	100.00
Margin of victory		51,545	20.52
Liberal hold			

=== 2013 ===
2013 Philippine House of Representatives election in the 2nd District of Cebu City
Party	Candidate	Votes	%
Liberal	Rodrigo Abellanosa	123,757	55.54
UNA	Aristotle Batuhan	99,073	44.46
Total votes		222,830	100.00
Margin of victory		24,684	11.08
Liberal hold			

=== 2010 ===
2010 Philippine House of Representatives election in the 2nd District of Cebu City
Party	Candidate	Votes	%
Liberal	Tomas Osmeña	125,575	64.44
Nacionalista	Jonathan Guardo	67,652	34.72
Independent	Makilito Mahinay	600	0.31
Independent	Edgar Abadiano	593	0.30
Independent	Lea Ong	457	0.23
Total votes		194,877	100.00
Margin of victory		57,923	29.72
Liberal gain from Lakas			

=== 2007 ===
2007 Philippine House of Representatives election in the 2nd District of Cebu City
Party	Candidate	Votes	%
Lakas	Antonio Cuenco (incumbent)	91,711	56.52
GO	Jonathan Guardo	70,538	43.48
Total votes		162,249	100.00
Lakas hold			

== See also ==
- Legislative districts of Cebu City
