= Cebu City Medical Center =

Geography
- Location: Bureau of Fire Protection Region 7 complex, Cebu City, Philippines
- Coordinates: 10°17′52″N 123°53′34″E

Services
- Emergency department: Yes
- Beds: 108

History
- Demolished: 2014 (old building)

The Cebu City Medical Center (CCMC) is a hospital in Cebu City. It currently operates inside the Bureau of Fire Protection's Region 7 compound after the hospital's previous building was significantly damaged due to the 2013 Central Visayas earthquake.

== History ==
The Cebu City Medical Center used to be hosted in a four-storey building and had a capacity of 300 beds which was declared structurally unfit and demolished after sustaining heavy damage due to an earthquake on October 15, 2013.

Under the administration of then Mayor Michael Rama, the building was demolished in February 2014. In June 2015, the construction of a new hospital building was approved by the Cebu City government. C.E. Padilla Construction was the contractor awarded to complete the first and second phase of the hospital building project.

Operations temporarily moved to the Bureau of Fire Protection's (BFP) Region 7 compound with the parking lot, main building, and gymnasium refurbished as patient wards and other hospital facilities. The bed capacity of the hospital was reduced to 108 beds.

Construction was put on hold in 2016 after Cebu City Mayor Tomas Osmeña halted works on the hospital building due to issues with its building permit. The hospital was still unfinished by the end of Osmeña's term in 2019. His successor, Edgardo Labella pledged to complete the hospital under his term.

The completion of the new hospital building, initially set to be operational in 2016 has been postponed several times. By August 2019, the structural framework of the building's seven floors were already in place and the first two floors already had rooms.

On December 28, 2020, the first three floors of the new hospital building were partially opened by Labella, Rama and other city government officials in a ribbon-cutting and opening ceremony. Its outpatient department was expected to start accepting patients on December 29, 2020 but was delayed since its partial occupancy permit was still being processed through the Office of the Building Official (OBO) according to Floro Casas Jr., the city administrator.
