= Mariano Cuenco =

President of the Senate of the Philippines from 1949 to 1951

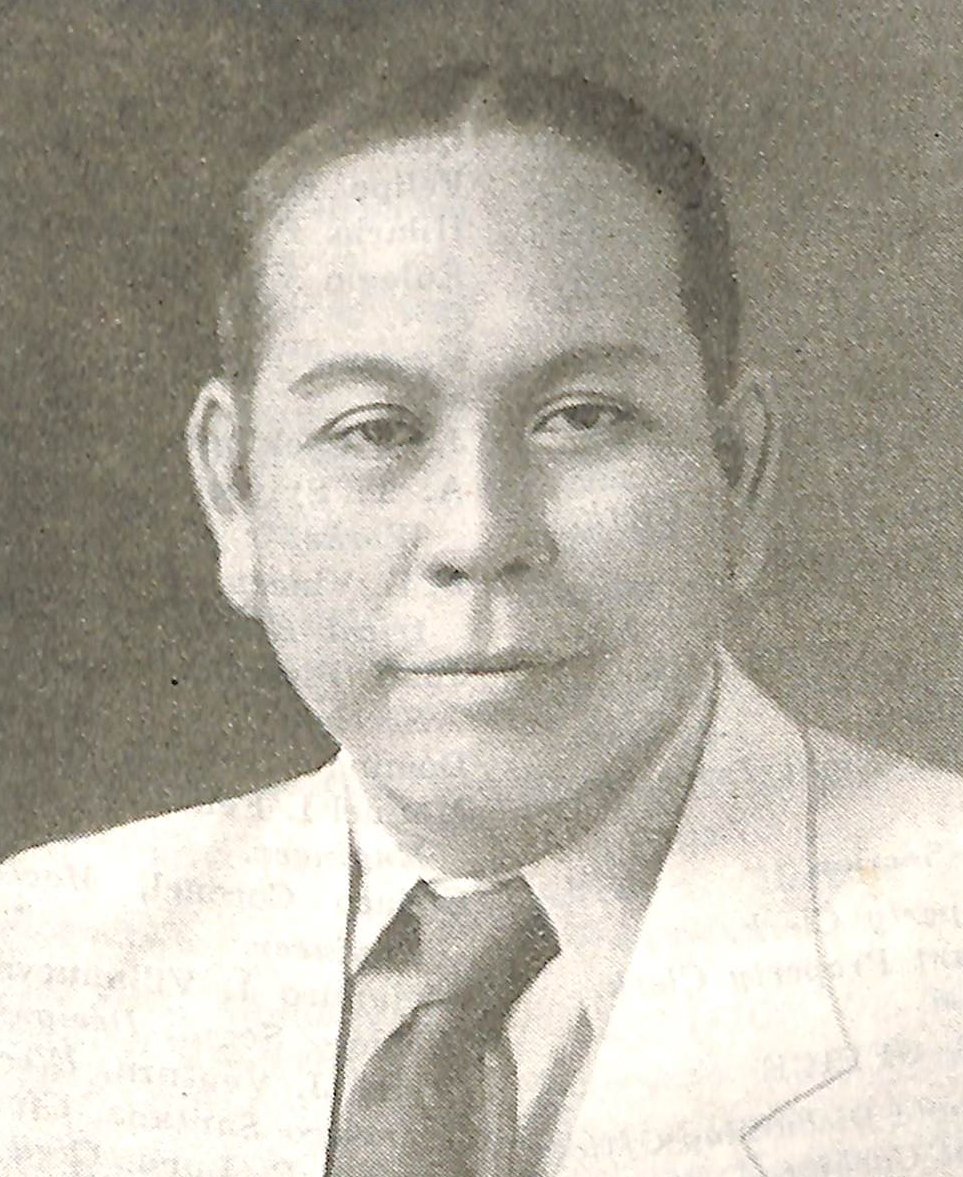

President of the Senate of the Philippines
- In office February 21, 1949 – December 30, 1951
- Preceded by: José Avelino
- Succeeded by: Quintín Paredes

Senator of the Philippines
- In office July 4, 1945 – December 30, 1951
- In office December 30, 1953 – February 25, 1964

Secretary of Public Works and Communications of the Philippines
- In office 1936–1939
- President: Manuel L. Quezon
- Preceded by: Antonio de las Alas
- Succeeded by: Jose Avelino

Municipal President of Cebu
- In office November 28, 1936 – December 1, 1936
- Appointed by: Manuel L. Quezon
- Preceded by: Fructuoso Ramos
- Succeeded by: Alfredo V. Jacinto

Governor of Cebu
- In office 1931–1934
- Preceded by: Arsenio Climaco
- Succeeded by: Sotero B. Cabahug

Member of the Philippine House of Representatives from Cebu's 5th district
- In office 1912–1928
- Preceded by: Troadio Galicano
- Succeeded by: Tomas Alonzo

Personal details
- Born: Mariano Jesús Cuenco y Diosómito; January 16, 1888 Carmen, Cebu, Captaincy General of the Philippines
- Died: February 25, 1964 (aged 76) Ermita, Manila, Philippines
- Resting place: Manila North Cemetery
- Party: Nacionalista (1912–1946; 1953–1964)
- Other political affiliations: Liberal (1946–1953)
- Spouses: Filomena Alesna (died); Rosa Cayetano
- Relations: Cuenco family
- Children: Manuel and others
- Occupation: Politician; writer

Mariano Jesús Cuenco y Diosómito (January 16, 1888 – February 25, 1964) was a Filipino politician and writer from Cebu. He was the 4th President of the Senate of the Philippines.

== Early life and education ==
Cuenco was born on January 16, 1888 in Carmen, Cebu. His parents are Mariano Albao Cuenco (1861–1909) and Remedios López Diosomito, both involved in the news media industry. He studied at the San Carlos College, where he graduated with a bachelor's degree in 1904. He finished law in 1911 at the Escuela de Derecho (later became the Manila Law School) and passed the bar examinations in 1913.

== Political career ==
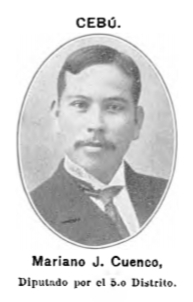
Cuenco as member of the Philippine Assembly, c. 1913

Cuenco entered politics in 1912 when he was elected to the Philippine Assembly representing the fifth district of Cebu. He was re-elected from 1916 to 1928.

He ran for the governorship of Cebu and won in 1928 and 1931. In his second term as Cebu governor, Cuenco became the President of the League of Provincial Governors in the Philippines. He lost the governorship to Sotero Cabahug in the 1934 elections.

In 1934, he was elected delegate to the Constitutional Convention where he was chosen floor leader. Cuenco was Secretary of Public Works and Communications from 1936 to 1939. He was also concurrent acting secretary of the Acting Secretary of the Agriculture, Commerce, and Labor Departments.

In 1941, Cuenco was elected Senator of the Philippines but the onset of the Second World War prevented that Senate from going into session. After the Japanese Occupation, Cuenco was reelected to the Senate in 1946. From 1949 to 1951, he served as Senate President and Chairman of the Commission on Appointments. His term paved the way for many reforms and his significant contributions resulted in a more efficient legislative body.

As a member of the Liberal Party of incumbent President Elpidio Quirino, Senate President Cuenco was defeated in his bid for reelection in the Nacionalista Party shut-out during the 1951 Philippine general election. He ran and regained his seat as a Senator once again in 1953 and 1959. He continued serving in the Philippine Senate until his death in office in 1964.

== Writing career ==
Cuenco was also writer. He was the publisher of the Spanish-language newspaper El Precursor of Cebu. In 1926, he became a member of the Philippine Academy of the Spanish Language, which is also under the auspices of the Royal Spanish Academy.

Cuenco also wrote in Visayan with some of his works being Ang Republikang Pilipinhon, Código, and Roma.

== Honors ==
He was honored by Spain with the Grand Cross decoration of the Order of Isabella the Catholic and by the Holy See with the decoration Pro Ecclesia et Pontifice.

== Personal life ==
Cuenco was married twice, first to Filomena Barcenilla Alesna, and after she died, to Rosa Cayetano.

== Death and legacy ==
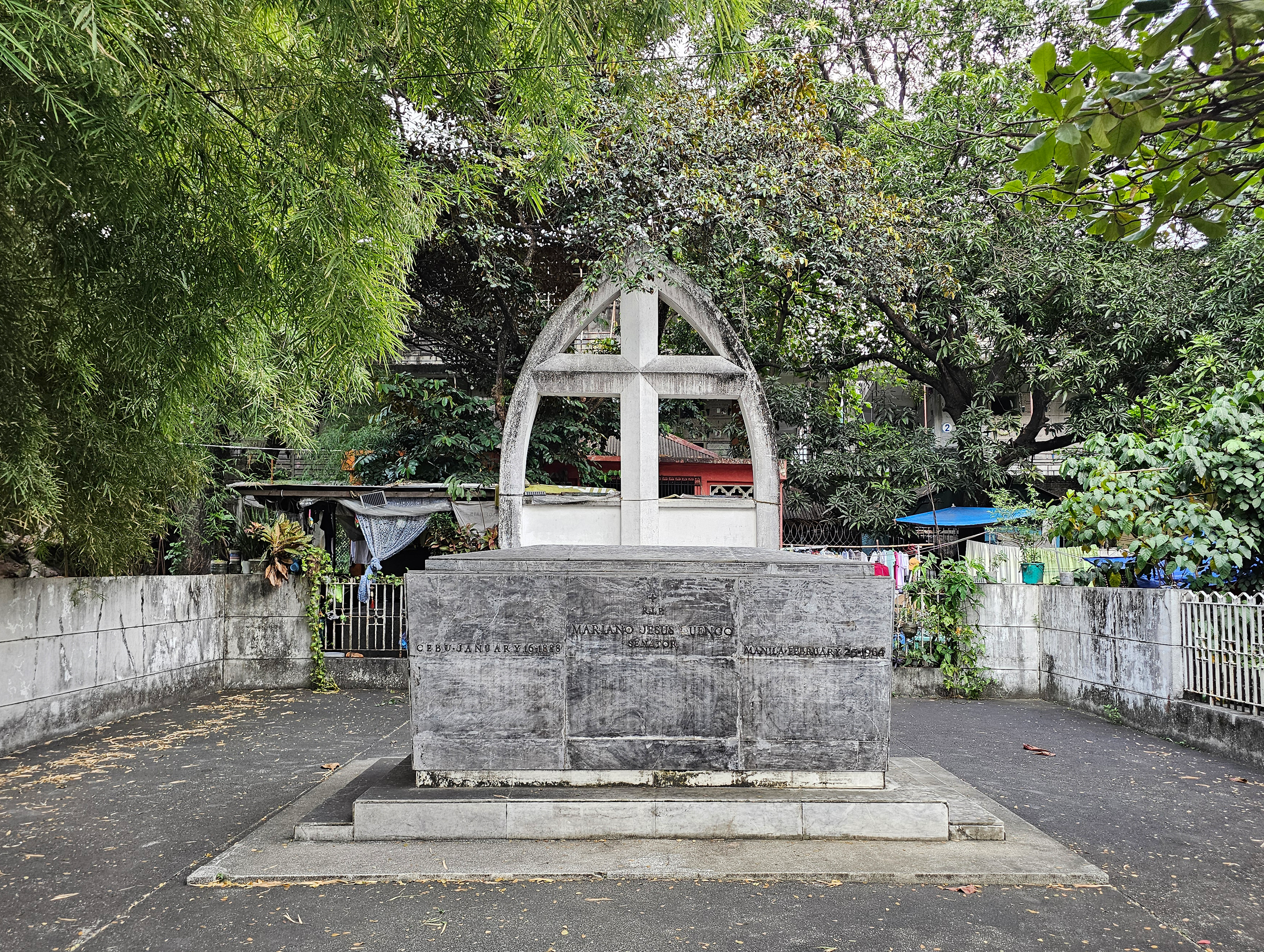
Tomb of Cuenco at the Manila North Cemetery

Cuenco died on February 25, 1964, at the age of 76 at Manila Doctors Hospital. His remains were interred at the Manila North Cemetery.

M.J. Cuenco Avenue, a major thoroughfare in Cebu City, was named after him through a resolution by the Cebu City Council on March 23, 1964.

Political offices
Preceded by José Avelino	President of the Senate of the Philippines; 1949–1951	Succeeded by Quintin Paredes
