= Cuenco family =

== Introduction ==
The Cuenco family is a multigenerational political and religious family from Cebu, Philippines, whose members have been active in public service, journalism, publishing, and the Catholic Church since the late nineteenth century. Its earliest documented patriarch, Mariano Albao Cuenco (1844–1909), was a Cebuano poet, teacher, and publisher who founded the Imprenta Rosario printing press, while his wife Remedios López Diosomito Cuenco managed the enterprise following his death and became one of the first female publishers in Cebu. Succeeding generations included Mariano Jesús Cuenco, who served as President of the Senate of the Philippines (1949–1951), and José María Cuenco, who became the first Archbishop of Jaro and founded the Catholic newspaper El Boletín Católico. Subsequent members have held elective and appointive posts in both national and local government, making the Cuencos one of Cebu’s longest-continuing political families.

== Later generations ==
In later generations, members of the Cuenco family continued to be active in public service, publishing, and business. One descendant, Emmanuel Luis Gonzalez (born June 21, 1951, Cebu City), is the son of Teresita Cuenco—identified in civil-registry records as a daughter of former Senate President Mariano Jesús Cuenco—and Anthony Gonzalez. Gonzalez later founded and was Chief Executive Officer of Plantation Bay Resort and Spa in Lapu-Lapu City, Cebu, a property noted for its lagoon-style architecture and hospitality standards.
