= Marblehead, Massachusetts =

- Town
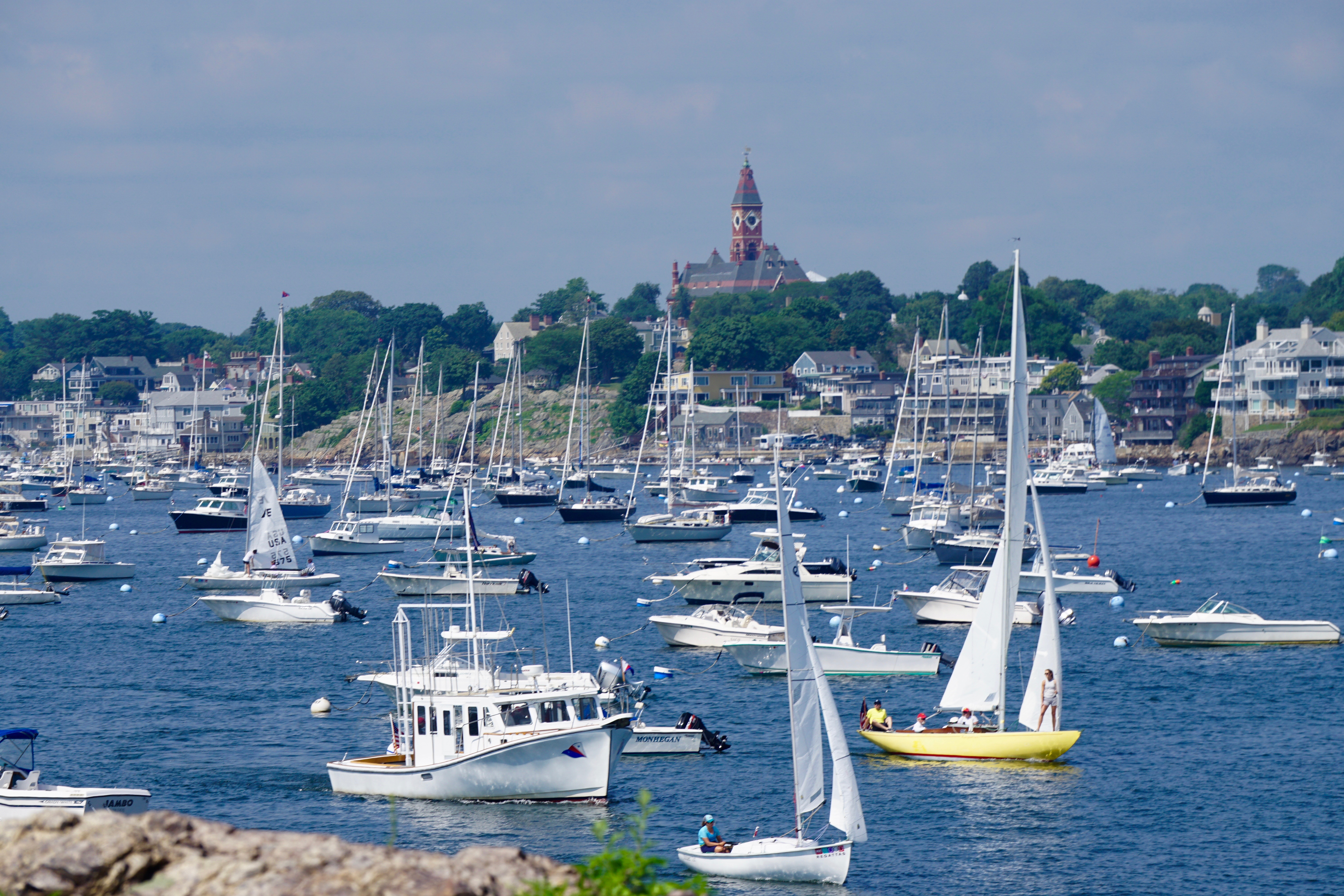
- Marblehead harbor viewed from the lighthouse

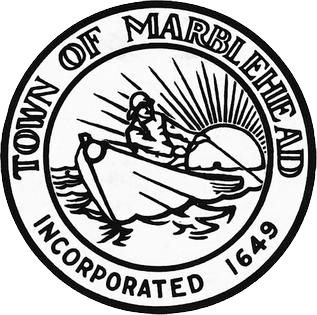
- Seal
- Nickname: MHD
- Motto: "Where History Comes Alive"
- Location in Essex County and Massachusetts
- Coordinates: 42°30′00″N 70°51′30″W
- Country: United States
- State: Massachusetts
- County: Essex
- Settled: 1629
- Incorporated: 1649

Government
  - Type: Open town meeting

Area
  - Total: 19.58 sq mi (50.71 km^{2})
  - Land: 4.39 sq mi (11.37 km^{2})
  - Water: 15.19 sq mi (39.34 km^{2})
- Elevation: 66 ft (20 m)

Population (2020)
  - Total: 20,441
  - Density: 4,656.26/sq mi (1,797.79/km^{2})
- Demonym: Header
- Time zone: UTC−5 (Eastern)
  - Summer (DST): UTC−4 (Eastern)
- ZIP Code: 01945
- Area code: 339/781
- FIPS code: 25-38400
- GNIS feature ID: 0618300
- Website: marbleheadma.gov

Marblehead is a coastal New England town in Essex County, Massachusetts, United States, along the North Shore. Its population was 20,441 at the 2020 census. The town lies on a small peninsula that extends into the northern part of Massachusetts Bay. Attached to the town is a near island, known as Marblehead Neck, connected to the mainland by a narrow isthmus. Marblehead Harbor, protected by shallow shoals and rocks from the open sea, lies between the mainland and the Neck. Beside the Marblehead town center, two other villages lie within the town: the Old Town, which was the original town center, and Clifton, which lies along the border with the neighboring town of Swampscott.

A town with roots in commercial fishing and yachting, Marblehead was a major shipyard and is often referred to as the birthplace of the American Navy, a title sometimes disputed with nearby Beverly. Marblehead was once the fishing capital of Massachusetts. It is also the origin of Marine Corps Aviation. Three US Navy ships have been named USS Marblehead. A center of recreational boating, Marblehead has long been a popular sailing, kayaking and fishing destination, with several yacht clubs established in the late 19th century.

It is home to the Marblehead Light, Fort Sewall, Little Harbor, Mass Audubon's Marblehead Neck Wildlife Sanctuary, Crocker Park, and Devereux Beach. Archibald Willard's famous painting The Spirit of '76 currently resides in Abbot Hall. Much of the Old Town is protected by the Marblehead Historic District.

Marblehead is also home of the Marblehead Men's Softball League, which was established in 1939 and is the oldest and longest standing adult softball league in the world.

== History ==
=== Massebequash ===
Marblehead was originally called Massebequash after the river which ran between it and Salem. The land was inhabited by the Naumkeag tribe of the Pawtucket confederation under the overall sachem Nanepashemet. Epidemics in 1615–1619 and 1633, believed to be smallpox, devastated the tribe. Numerous shell mounds and burial sites have been found throughout the town's history, along with foundations of multiple villages and forts. On September 16, 1684, heirs of Nanepashemet sold their 3,700 acres (15 km^{2}); the deed is preserved today at Abbot Hall in the town.

=== European settlers and fishing ===
Marblehead's first European settler was Joseph Doliber or John Peach (highly disputed) in 1629, who set up on the shore near what is now the end of Bradlee Road. Three years earlier, Isaac Allerton, a Pilgrim from the Mayflower, had arrived in the area and established a fishing village at Marblehead Little Harbor. In May 1635, the General Court of Massachusetts Bay established the town of Marblehead on land that belonged to Salem. Marblehead residents, who never saw eye-to-eye with their more devout and conservative neighbors, were delighted, but less than a year later, the lawmakers reversed themselves. Marblehead finally became independent of Salem in 1649.

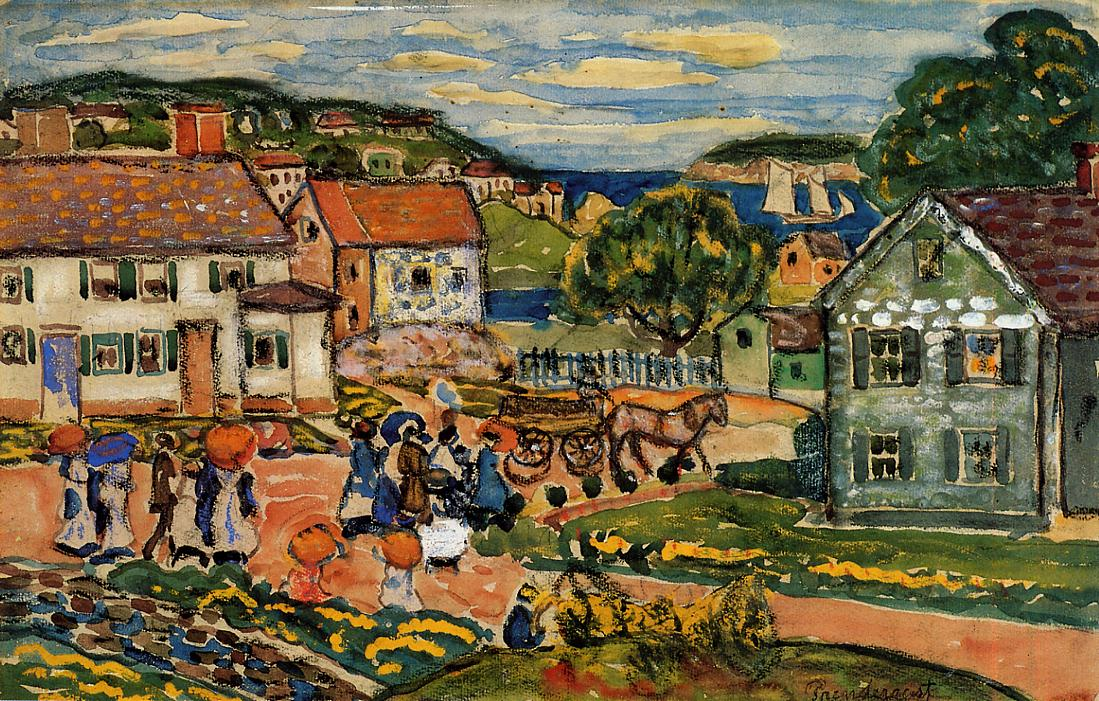
Marblehead, watercolor, Maurice Prendergast, 1914. Museum of Fine Arts, Boston

At times called "Marvell Head", "Marble Harbour" (by Captain John Smith) and "Foy" (by immigrants from Fowey, Cornwall), the town would be named "Marblehead" by settlers who mistook its granite ledges for marble. It began as a fishing village with narrow crooked streets, and developed inland from the harbor. The shoreline smelled of drying fish, typically cod. These were exported abroad and to Salem.

The town had one accused individual during the Salem Witch Trials, Wilmot Redd. She was found guilty of witchcraft and executed by hanging on September 22, 1692.

The town peaked economically just before the American Revolution, as locally financed privateering vessels sought bounty from large European ships. Much early architecture survives from the era, including the Jeremiah Lee Mansion.

=== Revolutionary War ===
A large percentage of residents became involved early in the Revolutionary War, and the sailors of Marblehead are generally recognized by scholars as forerunners of the United States Navy. The first vessel commissioned for the army, Hannah, was equipped with cannons, rope, provisions (including the indigenous molasses/sea water cookie known as "Joe Frogger"), and a crew from Marblehead. With their nautical backgrounds, soldiers from Marblehead under General John Glover were instrumental in the escape of the Continental Army after the Battle of Long Island.The Marblehead militia had become the 14th Continental Regiment of George Washington's army—and one of the few integrated regiments in the entire army. Marblehead men ferried George Washington across the Delaware River for his attack on Trenton. Many who set out for war, however, did not return, leaving the town with 459 widows and 865 orphaned children in a population of less than 5,000.

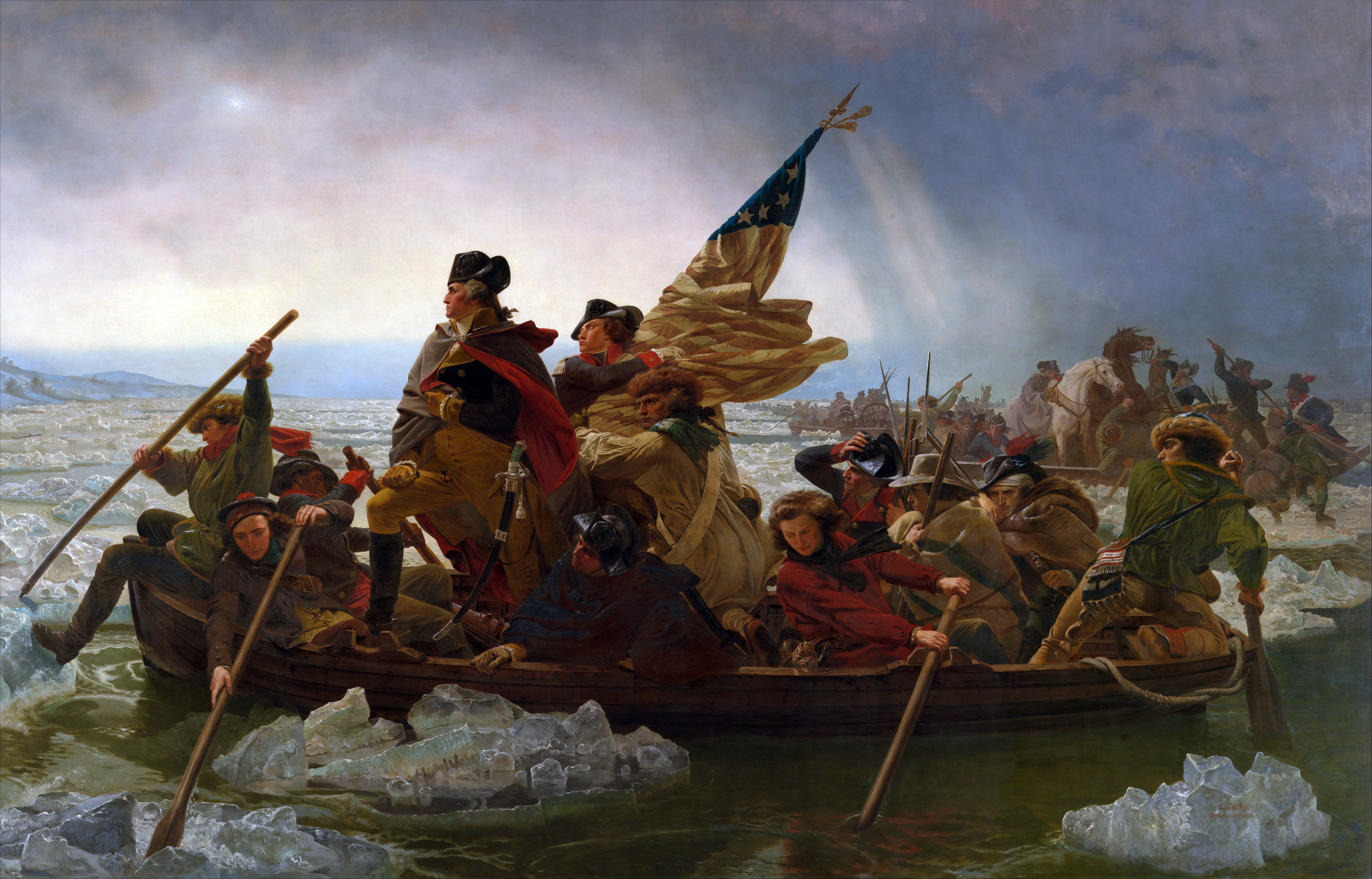
Marbleheaders rowing Washington across the Delaware

The community lost a substantial portion of its population and economy, although it was still the tenth-largest inhabited location in the United States at the first census, in 1790.

When George Washington visited the town during his presidential tour of 1789, he knew the sailors of Marblehead well; they had served him honorably in the war. He observed that the town "had the appearance of antiquity."

=== Fishing industry ===
In the 75 years from the American Revolution to the middle of the 19th century, Marblehead experienced a golden age of fishing. The War of 1812 brought disruption similar to during the American Revolution, with fishing grounds being blockaded, and fisherman heading off to war, with over 500 Marbleheaders being captured by the British. After the war, and later into the 19th century, wealthier citizens wanted a new bank to finance vessels, and to serve the town's fishermen and merchants. On March 17, 1831, with a capital of US$100,000, they founded the Grand Bank. The name was changed to National Grand Bank on October 3, 1864.

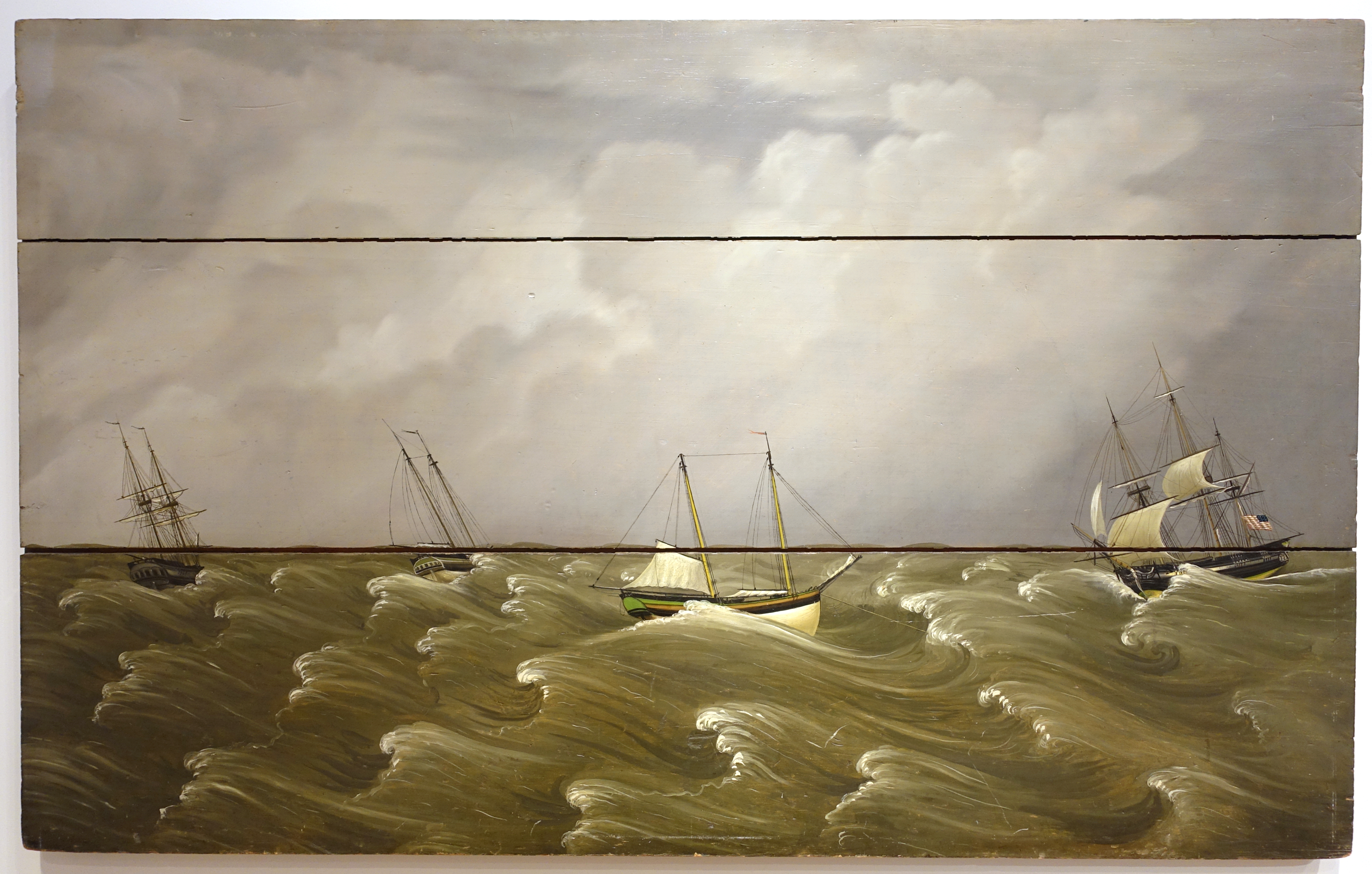
Eleven Marblehead ships were lost in Gale of 1846, painting by William Thompson Bartoll

The town's fishermen had 98 vessels (95 of which exceeded 50 tons) putting to sea in 1837, where they often harvested fish off the Grand Banks of Newfoundland. However, a gale or hurricane in that area on September 19, 1846, sank 11 vessels and damaged others. With 65 men and boys lost in the storm, the town's fishing industry began a decline. The storm is depicted in Fireboard: The Great Gale of 1846, c. 1850 by William Thompson Bartoll. A copy of the book is held by the Peabody Essex Museum.

=== American Civil War ===
During the Civil War, 1,048 Marblehead men went to war, joining both the Army and Navy. 110 died; 87 were wounded, many of whom died later of their injuries. During the war, Marblehead would raise almost $100,000 to supplement the war effort, an incredible effort for a town of 8,000 that relied mainly on fishing for income. Marblehead would be the first regiment in the state to answer the call for troops. A Grand Army of the Republic veterans organization was formed after the war, and established headquarters in the old town house, where it still displays artifacts from the Marblehead regiments that served.

=== Shoemaking, airplanes, and yachting ===
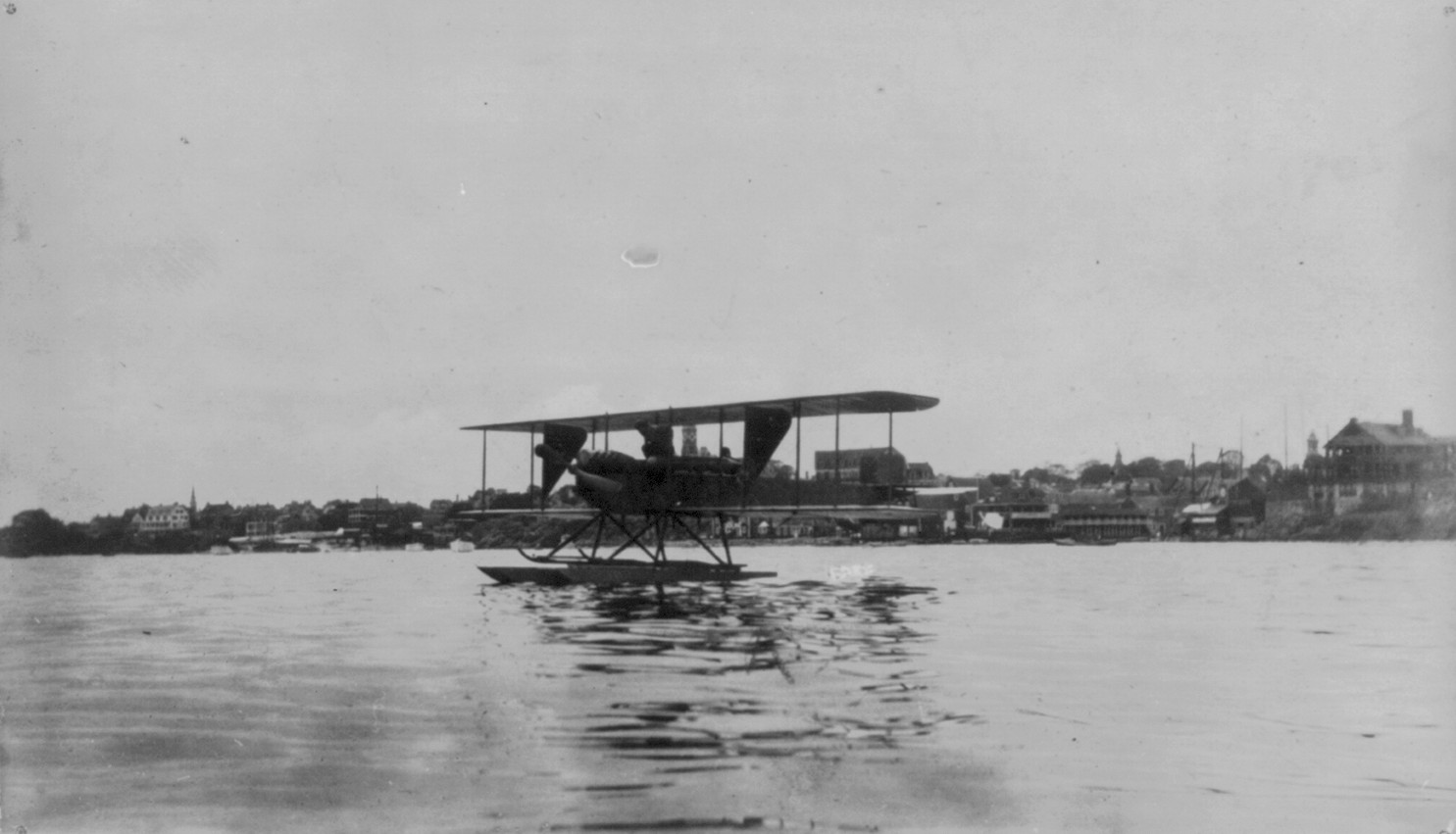
Burgess aircraft in Marblehead Harbor

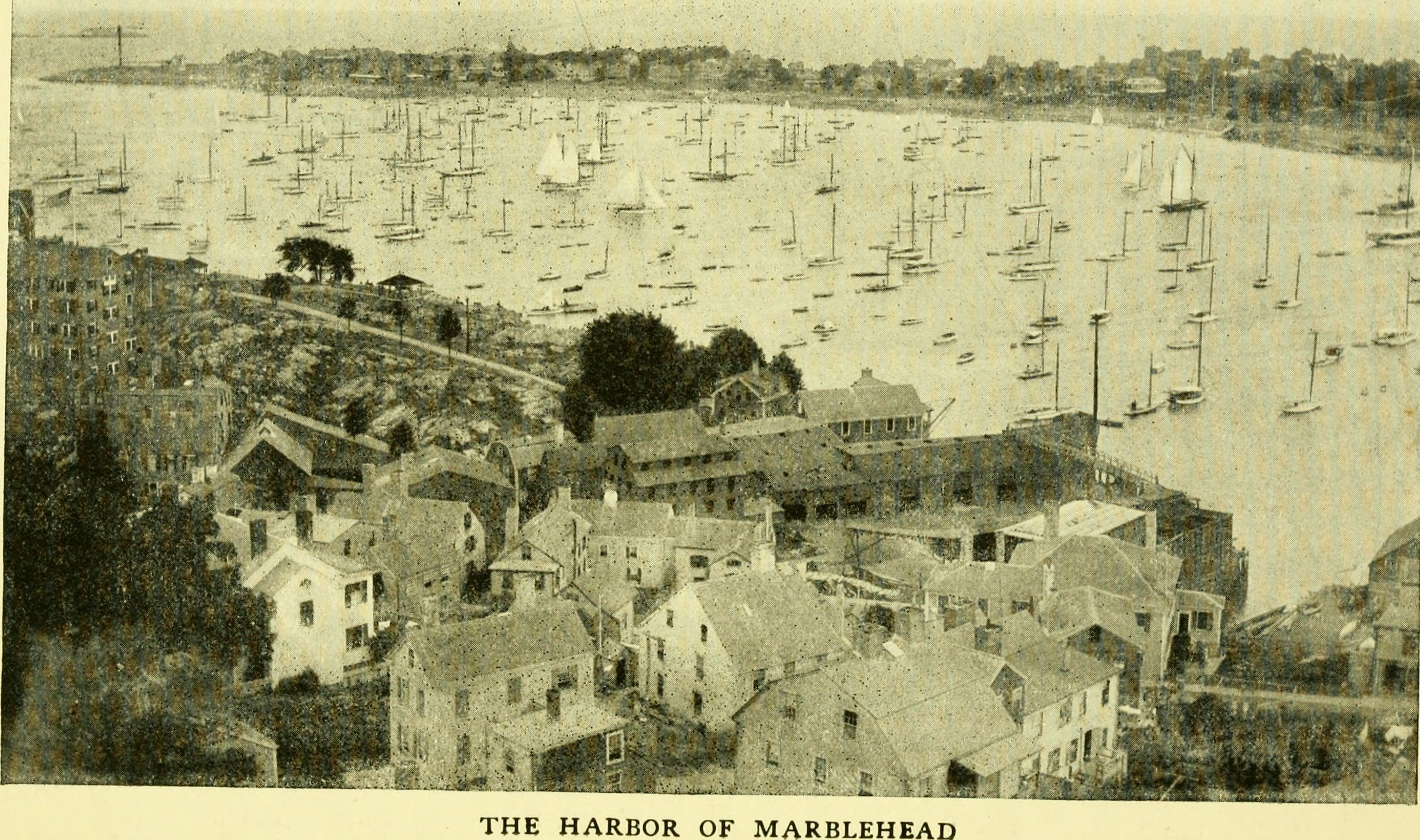
Marblehead Harbor 1916

During the late 19th century, Marblehead had a short-term industrial boom from shoe-making factories. At the same time, the exceptional harbor attracted yachting by wealthy boat owners, and some yacht clubs established centers there. It would become home to the Boston Yacht Club (the oldest, founded in 1866), Corinthian Yacht Club, Eastern Yacht Club, Marblehead Yacht Club, Dolphin Yacht Club, and the oldest junior yacht club in America, the Pleon Yacht Club. This also caused numerous "summer homes" of wealthy Boston residents to be built on Marblehead Neck. The building boom would cause Marblehead Light to be replaced in 1896 with a new iron structure since the light of shorter tower was becoming blocked by the large new homes.

Marblehead was also the site of the Burgess & Curtis Aircraft Factory, where it was the first licensed aircraft manufacturer in the United States. William Starling Burgess designed and flight-tested most of the aircraft that were manufactured at the two plant sites in town. On August 20, 1912, Alfred Austell Cunningham became the first Marine aviator, taking off from Marblehead Harbor in a Burgess Model H seaplane given to him by the Burgess Company. His flight was the start of United States Marine Corps Aviation.

=== Post-war suburban community ===
After World War II, the town enjoyed a population boom, developing as a bedroom community for nearby Boston, Lynn, and Salem. This boom ended around 1970, when the town became built out. Marblehead today continues to be a sailing and small-town tourism destination in the summer months.

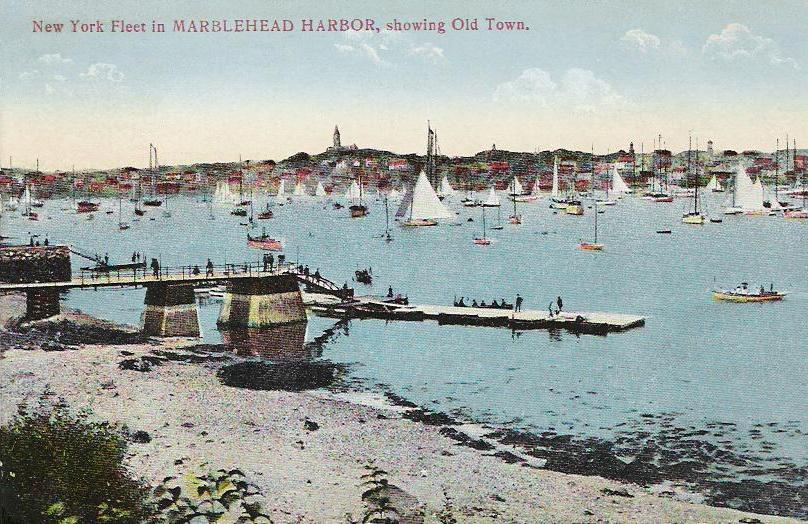
Marblehead Harbor, 1908

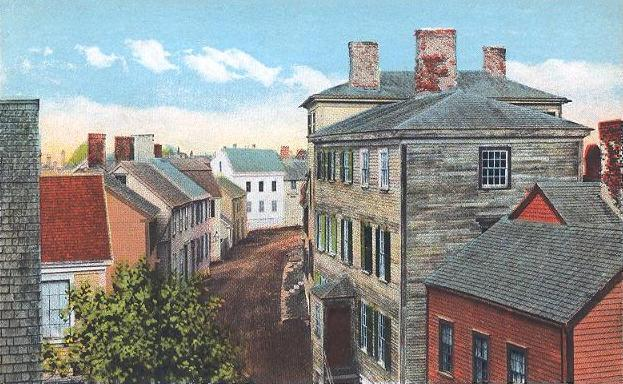
Front Street, 1914

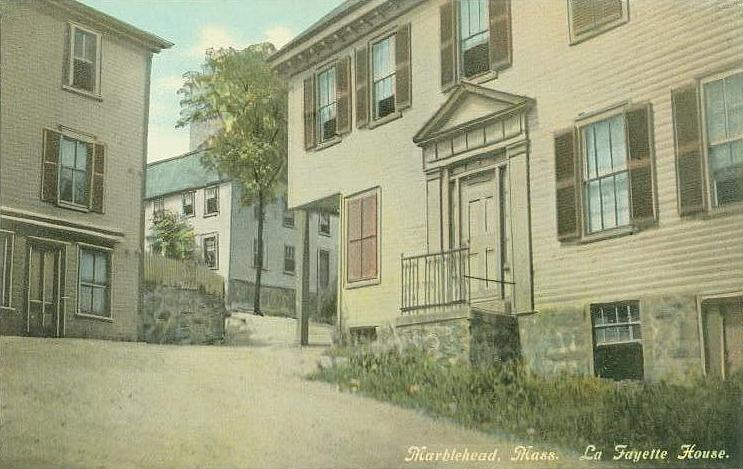
Lafayette House, c. 1908

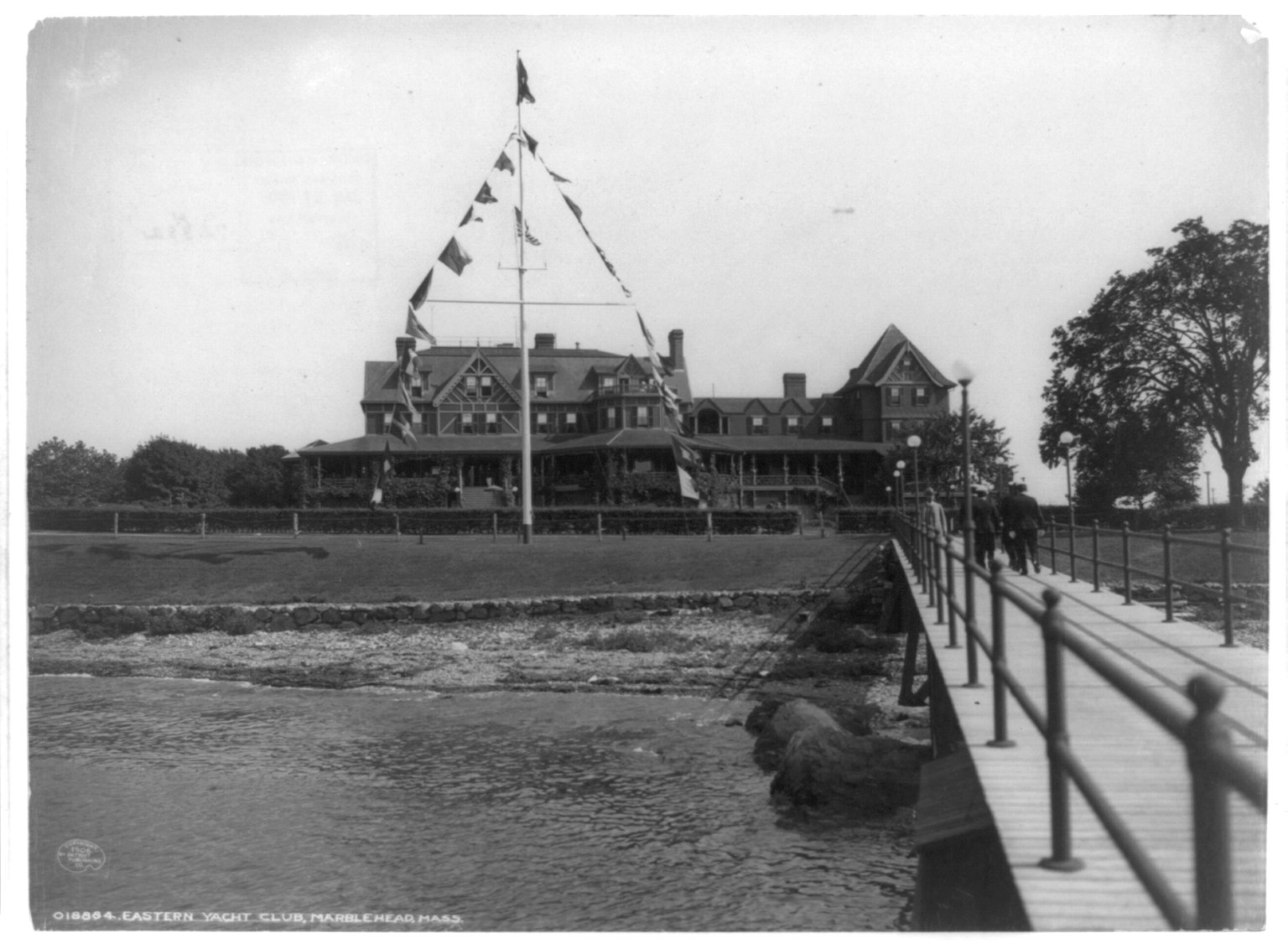
Eastern Yacht Club

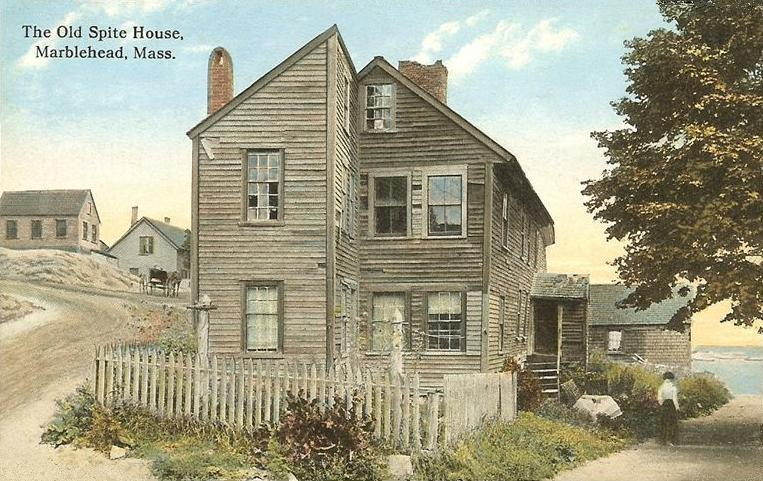
Old Spite House, c. 1912

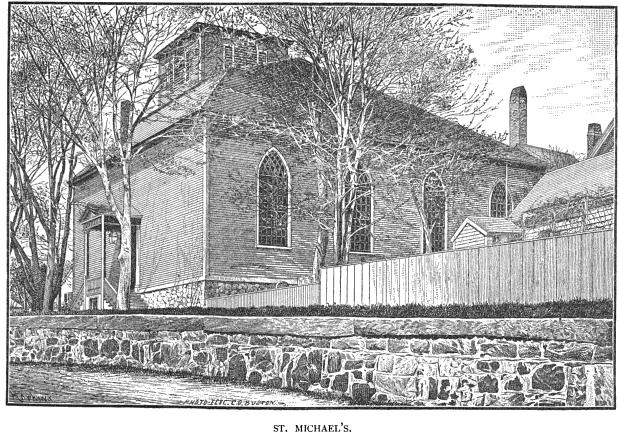
St. Michael's Church built in 1714

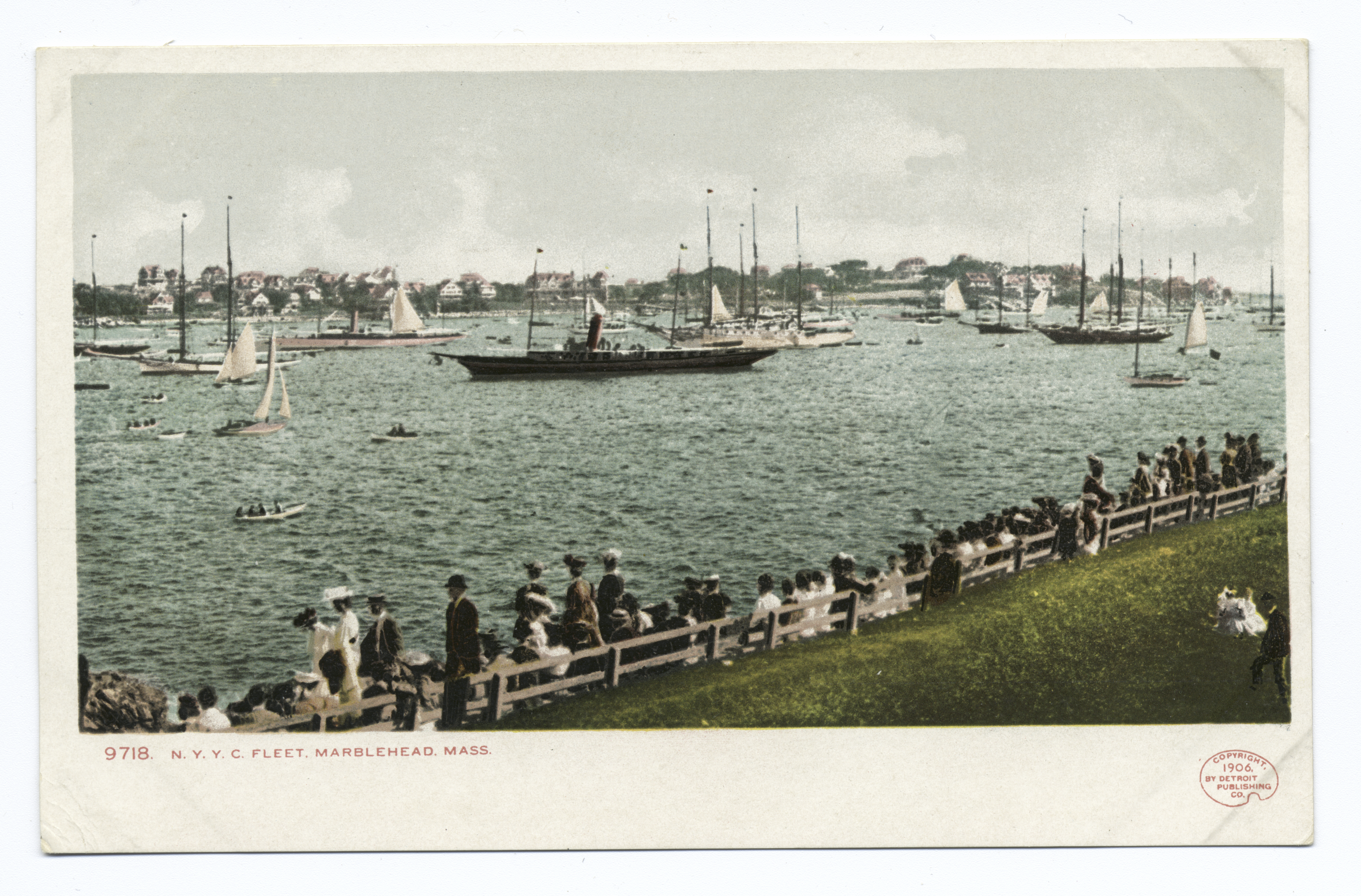
Yachts in harbor viewed from Fort Sewall

== Town government ==
The Town of Marblehead has an open town meeting, and is led by a Board of Selectmen. A board of seven selectmen first met on Friday, December 22, 1648.

=== Town hall ===
The seat of the first town government used the existing Meeting House on what is now the site of Old Burial Hill. The meeting house served as a place for the town to meet and the main church in town; a dual use that was typical during this time period. The second meeting house was built around 1696 on Franklin Street, which would become known as the "Old Meeting House", also serving the dual use of a town meeting location and church. In 1726, it was decided by the town to construct a separate Town House, which was completed in 1727 (Old Town House). However, the Old Meeting House would continue to occasionally be used for large town meetings, before it was demolished around 1825 after the new First Congregational Church was built (Old North Church). The Town House would serve as the town hall until the construction of Abbot Hall in 1876, where the town clerk and board of selectmen still meet today.

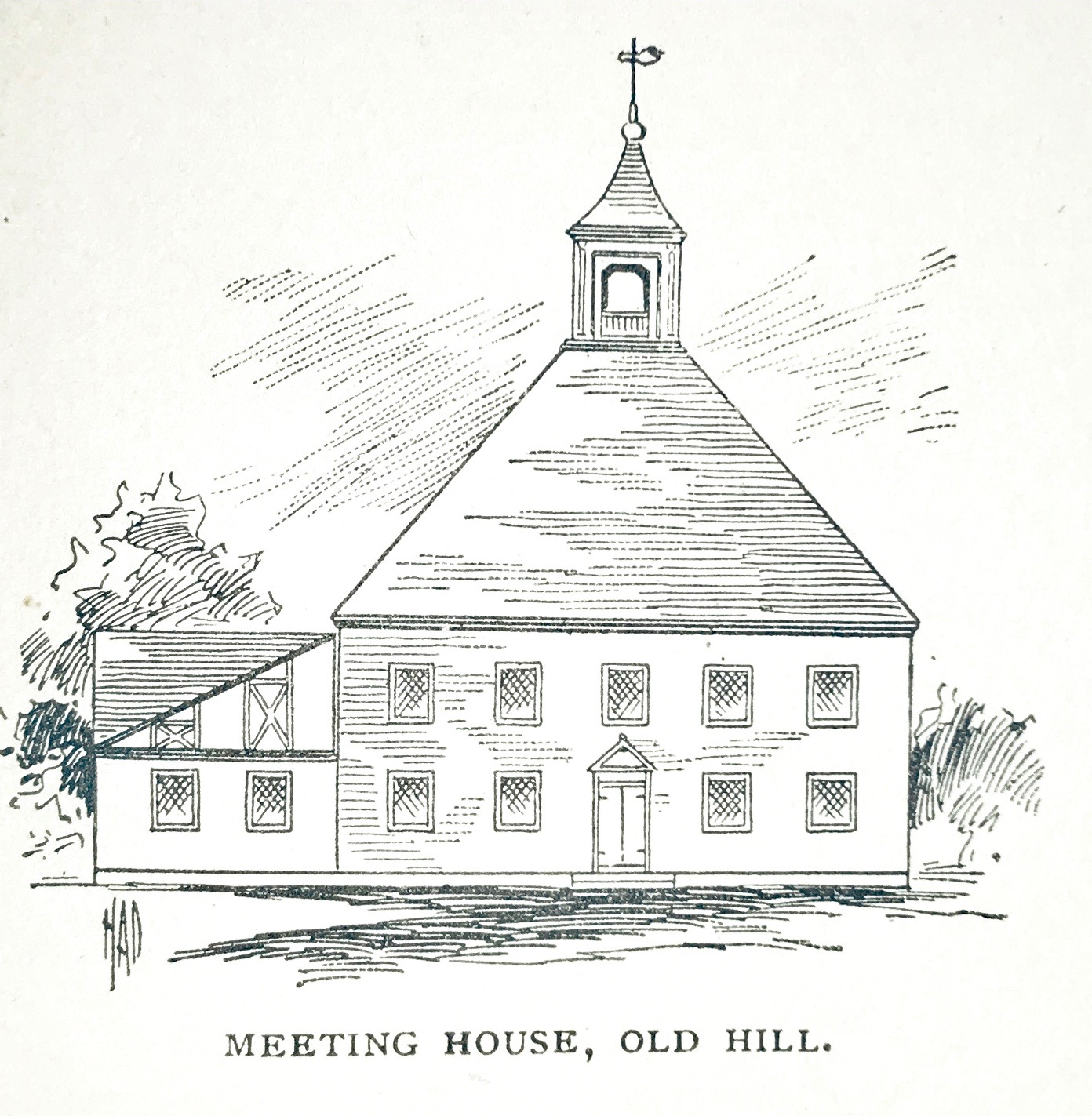
First Meeting House – 1638

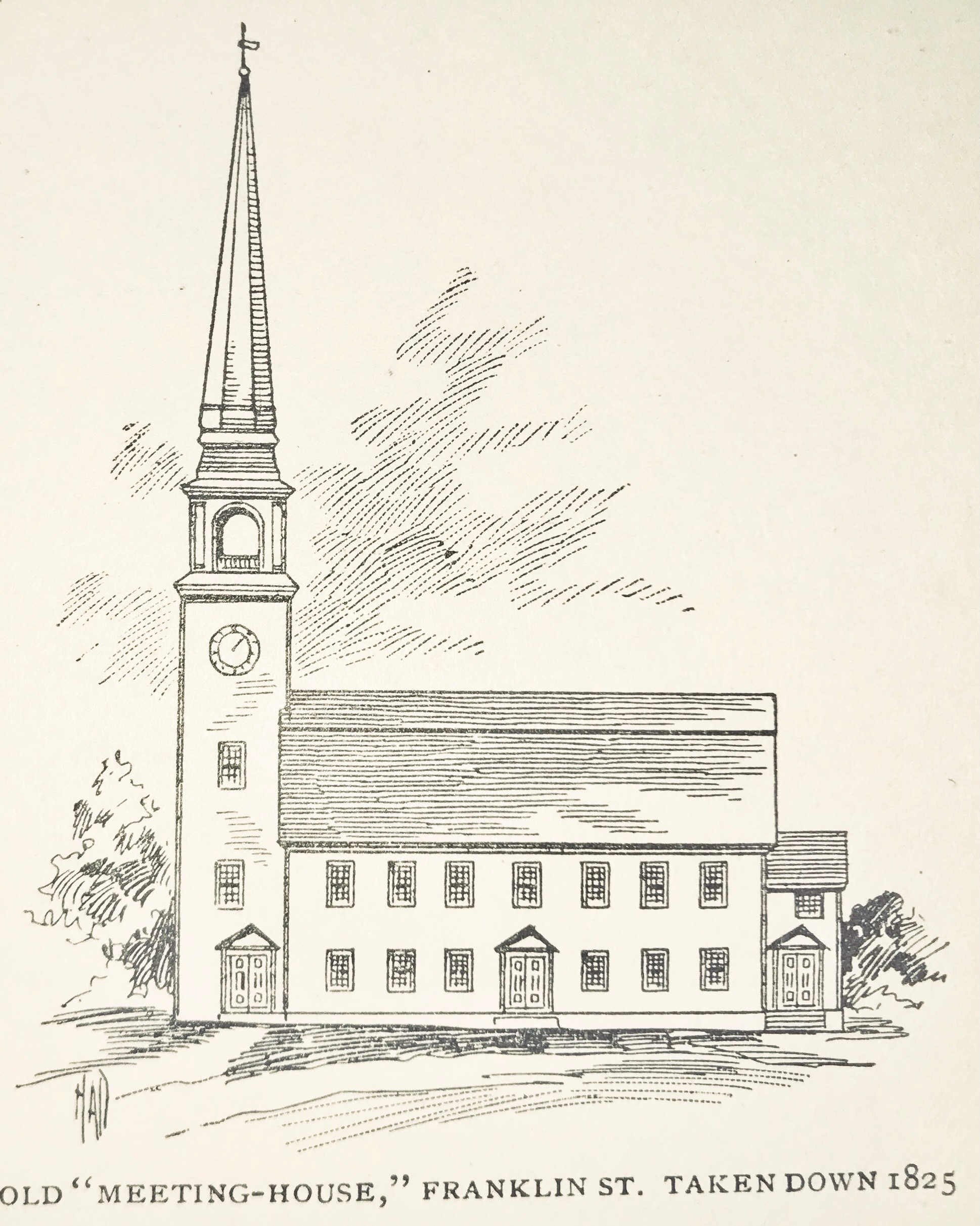
Old Meeting House – 1696

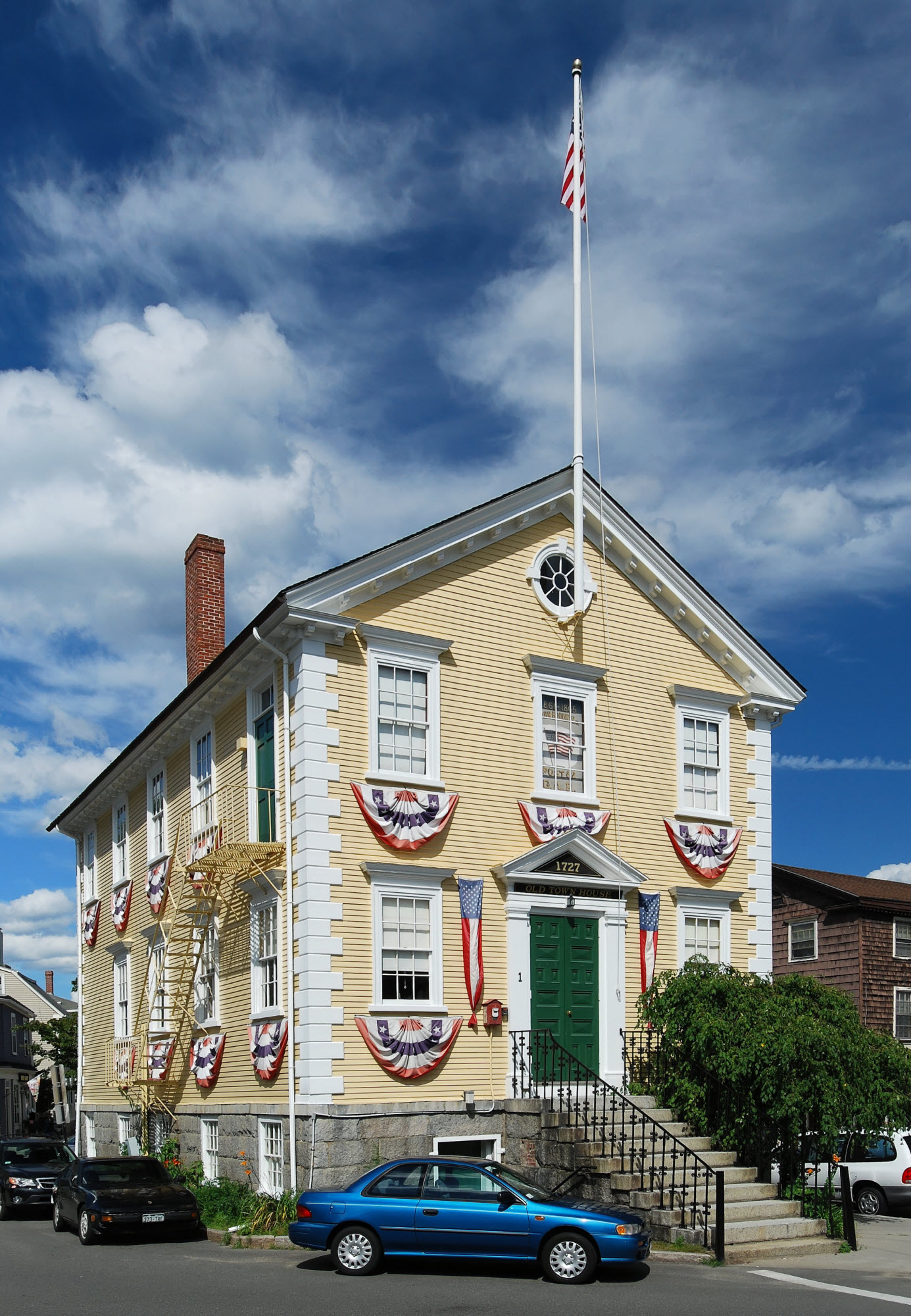
Old Town House – 1727

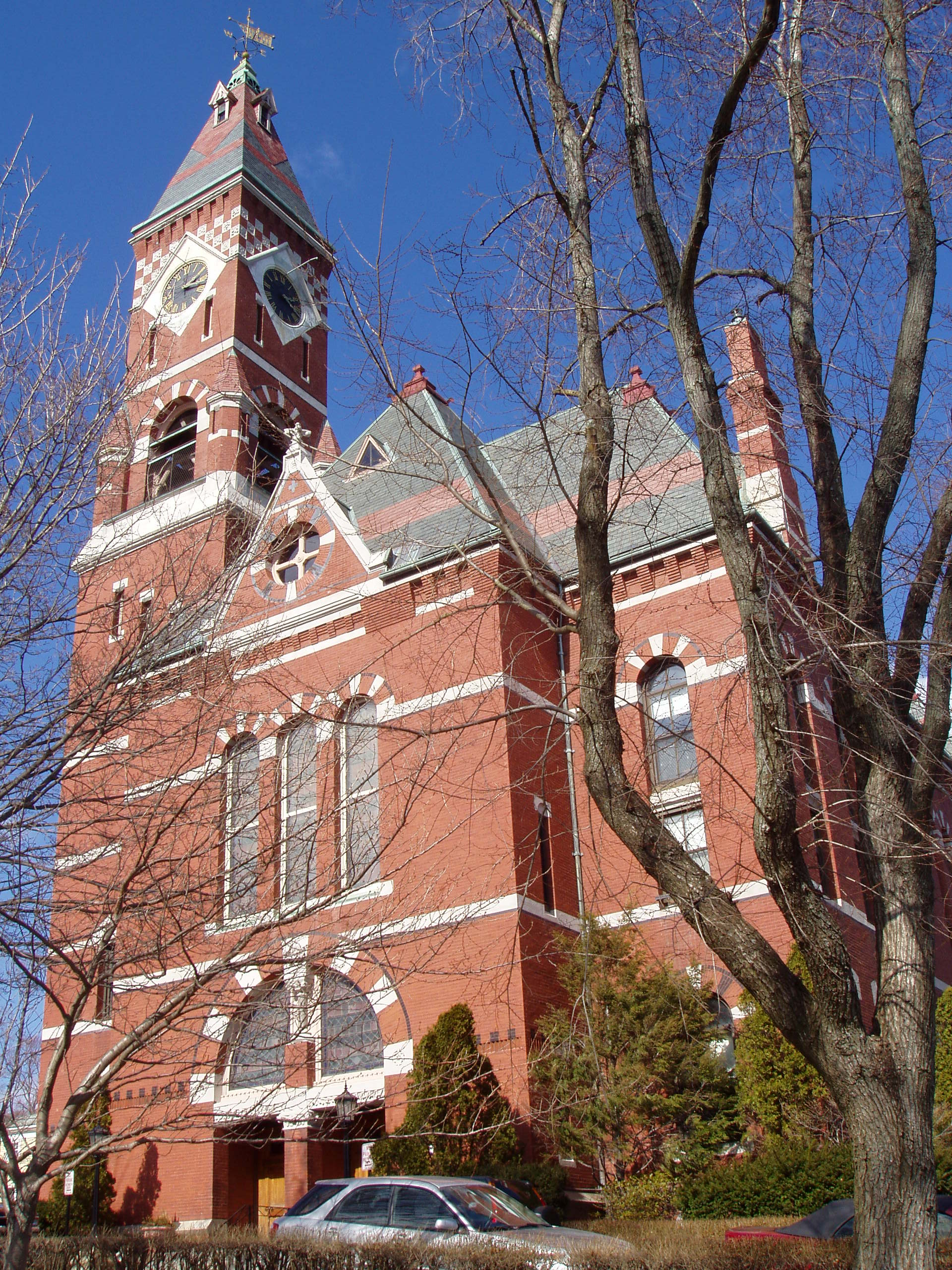
Abbot Hall – 1876

== Geography and transportation ==
Marblehead is comprised by a total of 4.4 square miles (11.4 km^{2}) of land and 15.2 square miles (39.4 km^{2}), or 77.61%, of water.

Marblehead is situated on the North Shore of Massachusetts along Massachusetts Bay and Salem Harbor. The town consists of a rocky peninsula that extends into the bay, with an additional neck to the east connected by a long sandbar, now a causeway. This ring of land defines Marblehead's deep, sheltered harbor. Marblehead Neck is home to a bird sanctuary, as well as Castle Rock and Chandler Hovey Park at its northern tip, where Marblehead Light is located.

Fountain Park and Fort Sewall are located at the western edge of the mouth of Marblehead Harbor. The town land also includes several small islands in Massachusetts Bay and Dolliber Cove, the area between Peaches Point and Fort Sewall. The town is partially divided from Salem by the Forest River, and is also home to several small ponds. In keeping with the town's location, there are four beaches (one in Dolliber Cove, one in Marblehead Harbor, and two along the southern shore of town), as well as six yacht clubs, one public kayaking center and several boat ramps.

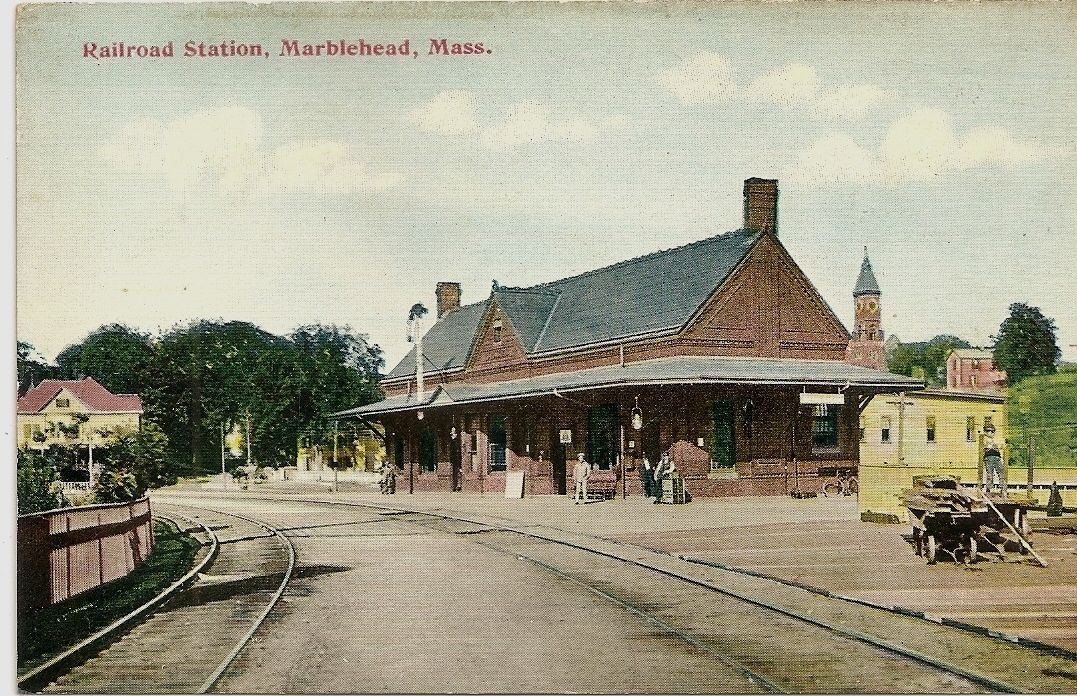
Marblehead old train depot

Besides Marblehead Neck, there are two other villages within town, the Old Town to the northeast and Clifton to the southwest. Given its small area, most of the residential land in town is densely settled. Marblehead's town center is located approximately 4 miles (6 km) from the center of Salem, 16 miles (26 km) northeast of Boston and 12 miles (19 km) southwest of Cape Ann. It is bordered by Swampscott to the south and Salem to the northwest. (As Salem's water rights extend into Massachusetts Bay, there is no connection between Marblehead and the city of Beverly across Beverly Harbor.)

Marblehead is home to the eastern termini of Massachusetts Route 114 and Route 129, which both terminate at the intersection of Pleasant Street and Ocean Avenue. Route 114 heads west into Salem, while Route 129 heads south along Atlantic Avenue into Swampscott towards Lynn. There are no freeways within town, with the nearest access being to Massachusetts Route 128 in Peabody and Beverly.

Two MBTA bus routes—the 441 and 442—originate in town regularly with service to Boston, with weekend service to Wonderland station in Revere. The former Eastern Railroad began service in 1839 and had lines connecting through Swampscott and Salem was discontinued in the late 1950s. The track routes were converted to bike trails and the three train depots were torn down. The Newburyport/Rockport Line of the MBTA Commuter Rail passes through neighboring Swampscott and Salem, with service between the North Shore and Boston's North Station. The nearest air service is located at Beverly Municipal Airport, with the nearest national and international service at Boston's Logan International Airport. Seasonal ferry service to Boston can also be found in Salem.

== Climate ==
According to the Köppen Climate Classification system, Marblehead has a humid continental climate or an oceanic climate, abbreviated "Cfb" or "Dfb" on climate maps. The hottest temperature recorded in Marblehead was 101 °F (38.3 °C) on July 23, 2011, and June 24, 2025, while the coldest temperature recorded was −20 °F (−28.9 °C) on February 4, 2023.

Climate data for Marblehead, Massachusetts, 1991–2020 normals, extremes 1984–present
| Month | Jan | Feb | Mar | Apr | May | Jun | Jul | Aug | Sep | Oct | Nov | Dec | Year |
|---|---|---|---|---|---|---|---|---|---|---|---|---|---|
| Record high °F (°C) | 71 (22) | 72 (22) | 91 (33) | 94 (34) | 97 (36) | 101 (38) | 101 (38) | 97 (36) | 97 (36) | 84 (29) | 78 (26) | 77 (25) | 101 (38) |
| Mean maximum °F (°C) | 56.8 (13.8) | 56.7 (13.7) | 65.3 (18.5) | 78.3 (25.7) | 86.4 (30.2) | 90.8 (32.7) | 92.7 (33.7) | 90.5 (32.5) | 87.9 (31.1) | 77.7 (25.4) | 68.8 (20.4) | 59.6 (15.3) | 94.7 (34.8) |
| Mean daily maximum °F (°C) | 36.1 (2.3) | 37.9 (3.3) | 44.3 (6.8) | 55.1 (12.8) | 65.2 (18.4) | 74.2 (23.4) | 80.3 (26.8) | 79.0 (26.1) | 72.3 (22.4) | 61.2 (16.2) | 50.7 (10.4) | 41.6 (5.3) | 58.2 (14.5) |
| Daily mean °F (°C) | 27.0 (−2.8) | 28.7 (−1.8) | 35.3 (1.8) | 45.4 (7.4) | 55.1 (12.8) | 64.3 (17.9) | 70.5 (21.4) | 69.3 (20.7) | 62.6 (17.0) | 51.8 (11.0) | 41.8 (5.4) | 33.0 (0.6) | 48.7 (9.3) |
| Mean daily minimum °F (°C) | 17.9 (−7.8) | 19.6 (−6.9) | 26.3 (−3.2) | 35.6 (2.0) | 45.0 (7.2) | 54.4 (12.4) | 60.7 (15.9) | 59.6 (15.3) | 53.0 (11.7) | 42.3 (5.7) | 32.9 (0.5) | 24.3 (−4.3) | 39.3 (4.0) |
| Mean minimum °F (°C) | 1.5 (−16.9) | 5.6 (−14.7) | 12.1 (−11.1) | 28.4 (−2.0) | 36.8 (2.7) | 45.5 (7.5) | 55.0 (12.8) | 53.1 (11.7) | 42.5 (5.8) | 30.8 (−0.7) | 21.3 (−5.9) | 10.3 (−12.1) | −0.7 (−18.2) |
| Record low °F (°C) | −6 (−21) | −20 (−29) | 3 (−16) | 8 (−13) | 26 (−3) | 35 (2) | 45 (7) | 42 (6) | 33 (1) | 13 (−11) | 6 (−14) | −8 (−22) | −20 (−29) |
| Average precipitation inches (mm) | 3.75 (95) | 3.50 (89) | 4.71 (120) | 4.30 (109) | 3.48 (88) | 4.14 (105) | 3.48 (88) | 3.25 (83) | 3.56 (90) | 5.00 (127) | 4.15 (105) | 4.70 (119) | 48.02 (1,218) |
| Average snowfall inches (cm) | 13.3 (34) | 8.5 (22) | 7.5 (19) | 1.5 (3.8) | 0.0 (0.0) | 0.0 (0.0) | 0.0 (0.0) | 0.0 (0.0) | 0.0 (0.0) | 0.1 (0.25) | 0.8 (2.0) | 7.4 (19) | 39.1 (100.05) |
| Average precipitation days (≥ 0.01 in) | 9.7 | 8.5 | 9.5 | 10.8 | 11.2 | 9.9 | 9.0 | 8.0 | 8.3 | 10.3 | 10.0 | 10.2 | 115.4 |
| Average snowy days (≥ 0.1 in) | 4.0 | 3.6 | 2.4 | 0.4 | 0.0 | 0.0 | 0.0 | 0.0 | 0.0 | 0.1 | 0.4 | 2.1 | 13.0 |
Source 1: NOAA
Source 2: National Weather Service

== Demographics ==
Historical population
| Year | Pop. | ±% |
|---|---|---|
| 1790 | 5,661 | — |
| 1800 | 5,211 | −7.9% |
| 1810 | 5,900 | +13.2% |
| 1820 | 5,630 | −4.6% |
| 1830 | 5,149 | −8.5% |
| 1840 | 5,575 | +8.3% |
| 1850 | 6,167 | +10.6% |
| 1860 | 7,646 | +24.0% |
| 1870 | 7,703 | +0.7% |
| 1880 | 7,467 | −3.1% |
| 1890 | 8,202 | +9.8% |
| 1900 | 7,582 | −7.6% |
| 1910 | 7,338 | −3.2% |
| 1920 | 7,324 | −0.2% |
| 1930 | 8,668 | +18.4% |
| 1940 | 10,856 | +25.2% |
| 1950 | 13,765 | +26.8% |
| 1960 | 18,521 | +34.6% |
| 1970 | 21,295 | +15.0% |
| 1980 | 20,126 | −5.5% |
| 1990 | 19,971 | −0.8% |
| 2000 | 20,377 | +2.0% |
| 2010 | 19,808 | −2.8% |
| 2020 | 20,441 | +3.2% |
| 2024* | 20,576 | +0.7% |
* = population estimate. Source: United States census records and Population Estimates Program data.

As of the census of 2010, there were 19,808 people, 8,838 households, and 5,467 families residing in the town. The population density was 4,373 inhabitants per square mile (1,688/km^{2}). There were 8,906 housing units at an average density of 1,966.3/sq mi (759.2/km^{2}). The racial makeup of the town was 97.6% White, 0.4% Black or African American, 0.1% Native American, 1.0% Asian, >0.1% Pacific Islander, 0.2% from other races, and 0.7% from two or more races. Hispanic or Latino of any race were 0.9% of the population.

There were 8,541 households, out of which 31.2% had children under the age of 18 living with them, 56.5% were married couples living together, 8.0% had a female householder, and 33.5% were non-families. Of all households 28.7% were made up of individuals, and 10.7% had someone living alone who was 65 years of age or older. The average household size was 2.37 and the average family size was 2.94.

In the town, the population was spread out, with 23.9% under the age of 18, 3.5% from 18 to 24, 28.0% from 25 to 44, 29.0% from 45 to 64, and 15.6% who were 65 years of age or older. The median age was 42 years. For every 100 females, there were 89.3 males. For every 100 females age 18 and over, there were 84.3 males.

According to a 2009 estimate, the median income for a household in the town was $97,441, and the median income for a family was $129,968. Males had a median income of $70,470 versus $44,988 for females. The per capita income for the town was $46,738. About 3.2% of families and 4.3% of the population were below the poverty line, including 5.7% of those under age 18 and 4.6% of those age 65 or over.

== Education ==
Marblehead Public Schools oversees four schools: Brown and Glover elementary schools; the Village School (grades 4–6); Marblehead Veterans Middle School; and Marblehead High School. The town is also home to the Marblehead Community Charter Public School, the first Commonwealth charter school to open in Massachusetts, as well as Tower School, a private day school for kindergarten through eighth grade.

== Town song ==
The Town of Marblehead has an official town anthem "Marblehead Forever". It is performed at most major town events and commemorations. It was written by the Reverend Marcia Martin Selman to the music of the hymn tune "The Lily of the Valley", from a melody by J. R. Murray, "Songs of Rejoicing", 1888.

== Media ==
=== Newspapers ===
Marblehead is served by three different local newspapers as of 2025. Two of them are weekly print newspapers, while one is a digital news site. The Marblehead Weekly News was founded in 2022 by Essex Media Group, the publisher of The Daily Item of Lynn. It is mailed to all households in town.

The Marblehead Current was also launched in 2022. It was founded by former employees of the Marblehead Reporter, which had its local coverage entirely cut by its corporate owner, Gannett. It also has a print edition which is mailed to all households in town.

The Marblehead Independent is a local news website founded in 2025. It was created by a co-founder of the Marblehead Current who had his full time position cut due to funding shortages.

Defunct news sources include the weekly Marblehead Reporter and the digital Marblehead Beacon, which published from 2021 to 2023.

== Points of interest ==
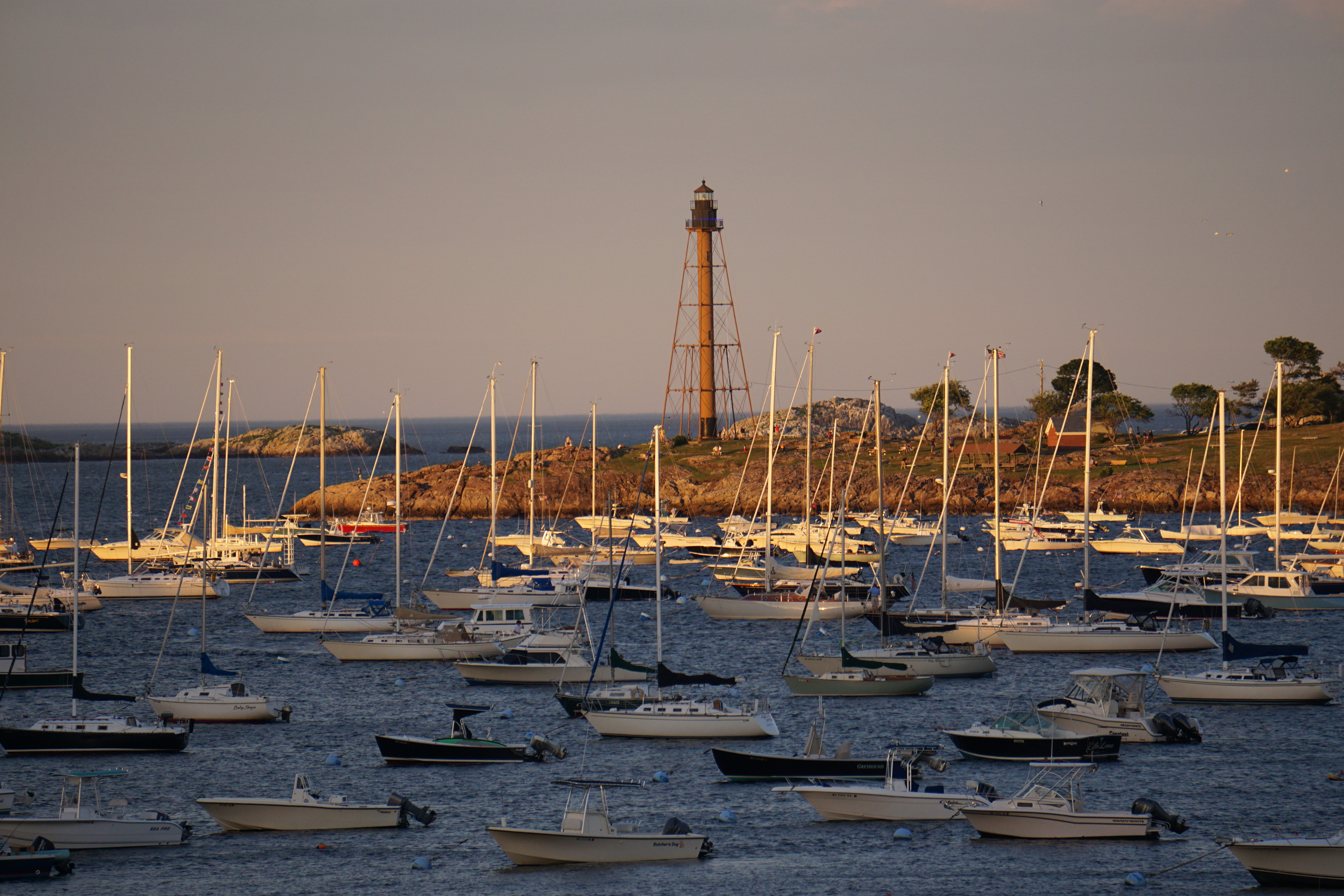
Marblehead Light

- Castle Rock Park
- Crocker Park, the gift of Uriel Crocker
- Crowninshield (Brown's) Island
- Gerry Island, an island named after founding father & Marbleheader, Elbridge Gerry
- The Driftwood
- Herreshoff Castle
- The Landing, public town dock on Front Street
- Marblehead Historic District
- Marblehead Light, Chandler Hovey Park
- Marblehead Neck Wildlife Sanctuary
- Pleon Yacht Club, the oldest junior yacht club in the United States

=== Historical sites and museums ===
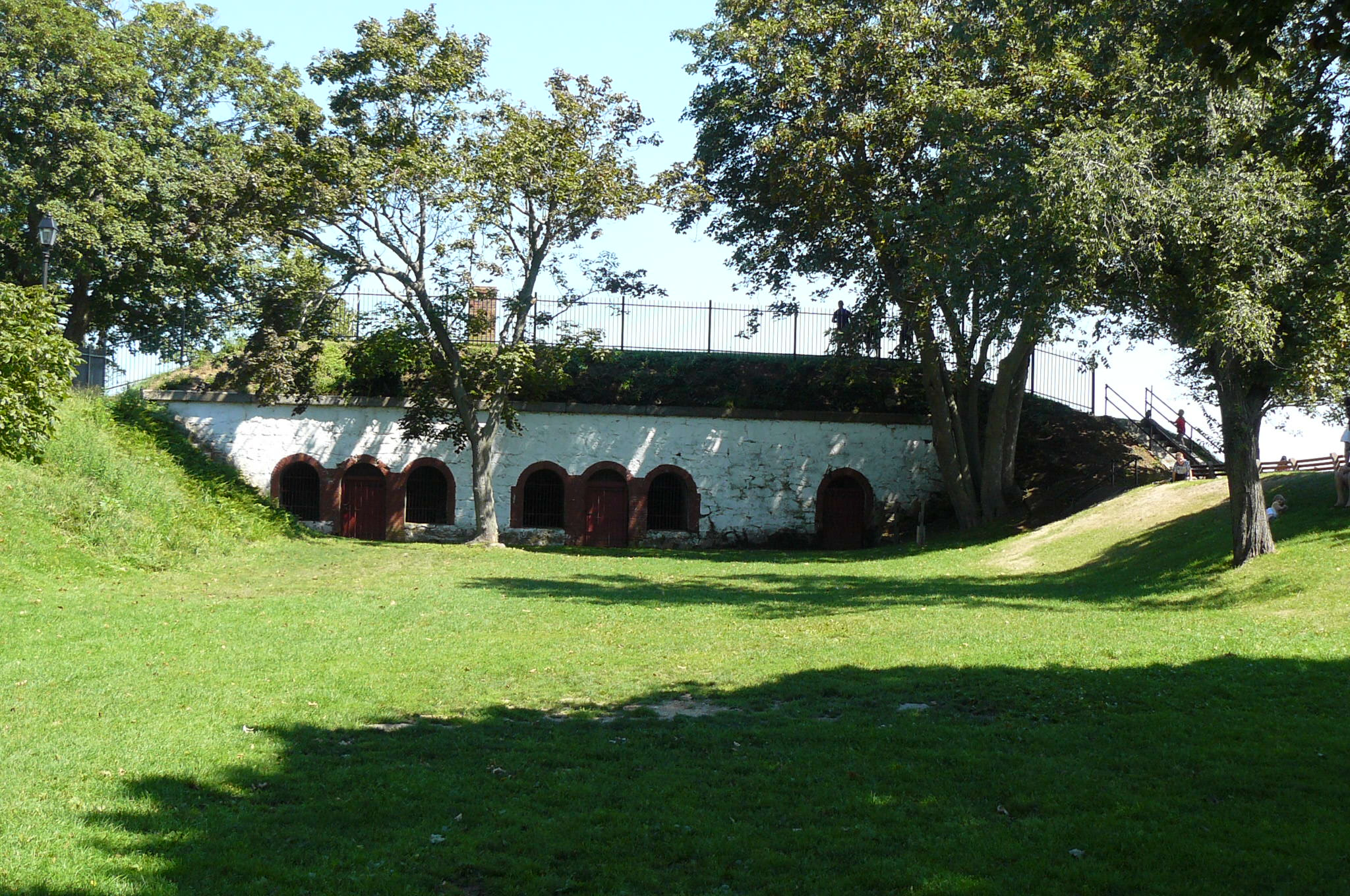
Fort Sewall

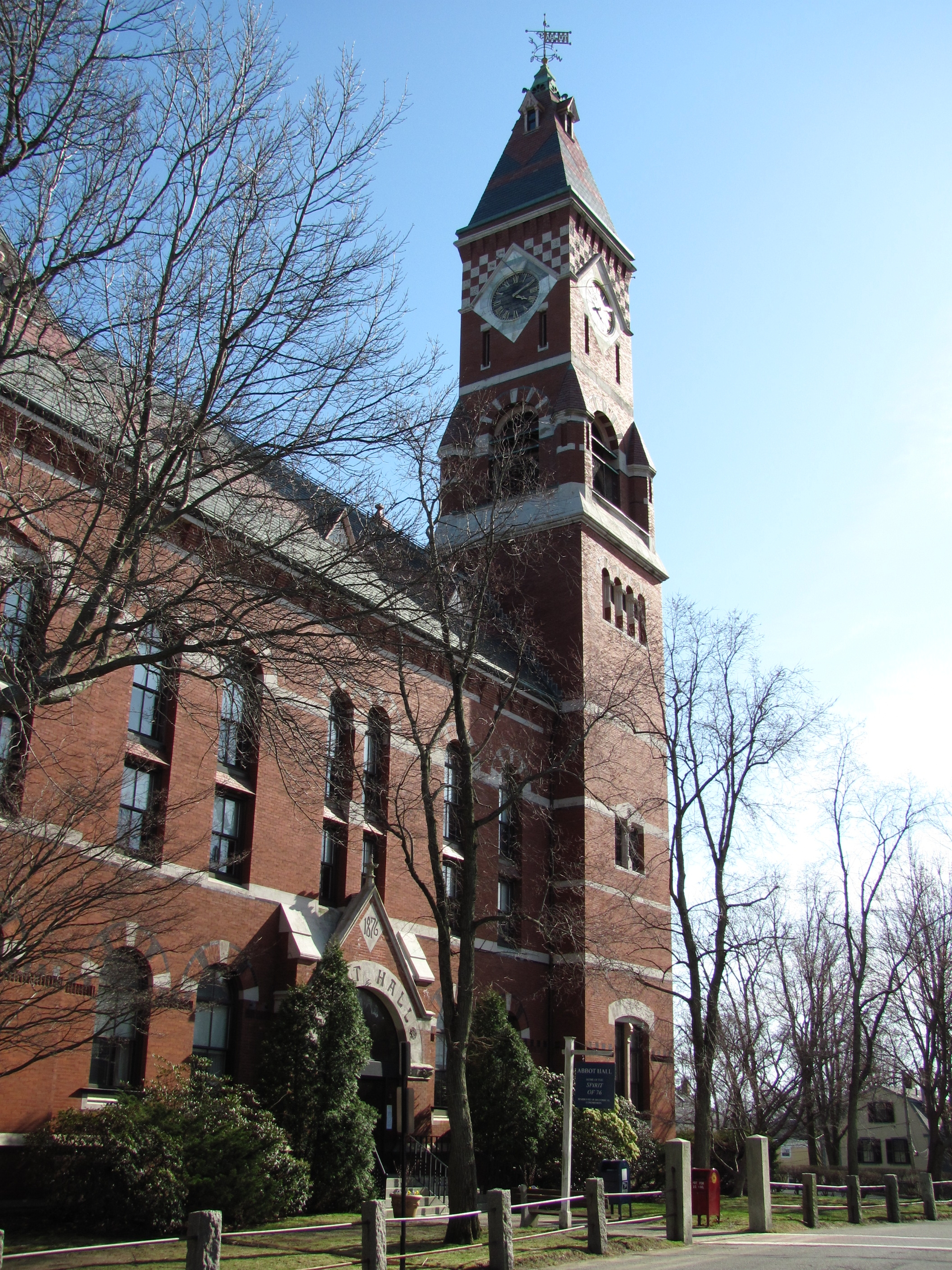
Abbott Hall

- Abbot Hall (1877), containing The Spirit of '76 by Archibald MacNeal Willard, & Maritime Exhibit
- Fort Sewall (1644)
- Old Burial Hill (1638)
- Marblehead Museum
- Old Town House (1727) & G.A.R. Civil War Museum
- General John Glover House
- General Glover Farm
- Jeremiah Lee Mansion (1768)
- King Hooper Mansion (1728), now home to the Marblehead Arts Association.
- Old Powder House (1755)
- Ambrose Gale House (1663)
- Simon Bradstreet House (1723)
- St. Michael's Church (1714)
- Old North Church (1824)
- William L. Hammond Park (formally recognized as the birthplace of Marine Corps Aviation, 1977)
- Gun House (1810)

=== Cemeteries & Burial Grounds ===
Marblehead has multiple historic cemeteries and public and private burial grounds found within the town borders. There have also been Native America burials sites found throughout town.

Town Cemeteries
| Name | Notes |
|---|---|
| Old Burial Hill | Founded around 1638, oldest in town |
| Harris Street Cemetery | Adjacent to Unitarian Church cemetery |
| Hooper Tomb | Tomb for the Hooper family |
| Green Street Cemetery | Formerly known as Elm Street Cemetery. |
| Hathaway Family Crypt | Hathaway family member |
| Waterside Cemetery | Still in use, founded in 1859 |
| Harbor View Cemetery | Still in use, adjacent to Waterside Cemetery |
Church Cemeteries
| Star of the Sea Cemetery | Cemetery in association with Star of the Sea Church |
| Unitarian Cemetery | Partially built over with Unitarian church addition in 1960s |
| St Michaels Cemetery & Crypt | Founded around 1714 (approx) |
| St Andrews Cemetery | Contains Wyman family burial plot |
Unmarked Burial Grounds
| Pleasant Street | African American and pauper burial ground, located in gulley behind Masonic Hall & 66 Pleasant Street. |
| Back Street (Elm Street) burial ground | 18th century African American and pauper burial ground near historic Gun House |
| Pond Street Almhouse | Pauper burials around 1726 |
| Cloutman Farm | Burials near Cloutman Farmhouse |
| Cow Fort (Seaside Park) | Burial sites for 1764 smallpox victims |
| Gatchell Farm | Family burial plot in proximity to swamp, bodies moved in the 1930s to Old Burial hill when converted to park. |
| Sewall & Spring Street | Burial site in front of former Sewall school house |
Native Burial Grounds
| Naugus Head | Native burials site with four individuals found at Sparhawk Terrace, believed to be pre colonial |
| West Shore Drive | Native burial site discovered near former village in Waterside Cemetery |
| Bessom Pasture | Native burials discovered in 1874 survey by Essex Institute |
| Marblehead Neck | Native burial site |
| Clifton - Atlantic Ave | Native burial site, in circular pattern near extent of former Glover Farm. |

== Notable people ==
=== Politicians and military ===
- Nicholson Broughton, first Captain of the American Navy
- Elbridge Gerry, fifth Vice President of the United States
- John Glover, Revolutionary War general
- John Manley, Commodore, American Navy
- David D. McKiernan, retired United States Army four-star general
- Seth Moulton, retired Marine Corps officer and a Democratic Congressman
- Samuel Sewall, Congressman, great uncle to Louisa May Alcott
- Joseph Story, Supreme Court justice
- Richard Trefry, 42nd Inspector General United States Army

=== Athletes ===
- Sheldon Brown, bicycle mechanic and author of books on cycling
- Shalane Flanagan, Olympic runner, Beijing Olympics Silver medalist, 2017 New York Marathon winner
- Tyler Hamilton, cyclist
- Kayla Harrison, mixed martial artist, won the 2010 World Championships, gold medals at the 2012 and 2016 Olympics
- Ted Hood, yachtsman, America's Cup winner
- Shawn McEachern, Stanley Cup winner
- Maureen McKinnon-Tucker, Gold Medalist Sailing 2008 Summer Paralympics
- Jake Phelps, skateboarder – editor-in-chief Thrasher Magazine
- Cory Schneider, New Jersey Devils goaltender

=== Architects and yacht designers ===
- William Starling Burgess, yacht designer and aircraft manufacturer
- L. Francis Herreshoff, yacht designer

=== Businessmen and entrepreneurs, philanthropists ===
- Uriel Crocker, publisher, businessman
- Joseph Dixon: inventor who pioneered in the industrial use of graphite, leading to Dixon Ticonderoga pencils
- James J. H. Gregory, philanthropist, started Marblehead libraries, horticulturalist "seed king", historian, poet
- Peter Lynch, investor, author
- Michael Smith, American diplomat and trade negotiator

=== Writers and journalists ===
- Ashley Bowen, first American sailor to write an autobiography
- Susan Estrich, lawyer, professor, author, political operative
- Julia Glass, novelist
- Katherine Howe, novelist
- Ada Louise Huxtable, architecture critic, lived in Marblehead seasonally for over 30 years
- Martha Hooper Blackler Kalopothakes (1830–1871), missionary, journalist, translator
- Ruth Edna Kelley, author
- Harry Kemelman, novelist
- Edward A. Lawrence, Jr. (1847-1893), Protestant pastor, author; namesake of Lawrence House in Baltimore
- Caroline Atherton Mason, poet
- Grace A. Oliver, author
- Eugene O'Neill, playwright and winner of the Nobel Prize in Literature 1936
- Rhod Sharp, news journalist, broadcaster, BBC – "Up All Night"
- Amy Siskind, activist and author
- Tasha Tudor, Caldecott honored children's author and illustrator, daughter of William Starling Burgess, great-granddaughter of Frederic Tudor

=== Arts and entertainment ===
- Keith Ablow, former psychiatrist, writer, host and pundit
- Frank Black, musician and member of the alternative rock band Pixies
- Chester B. Clapp, film screenwriter
- Rob Delaney, comedian and "funniest person on Twitter"
- Loyd Grossman, UK television host
- Dave Mattacks, English-born rock and folk drummer and session musician; former member of Fairport Convention and guest percussionist for Jethro Tull
- Pete Muller, National Geographic photographer
- Estelle Parsons, actress, Academy Award winner for Actress in a Supporting Role – Bonnie and Clyde (1967)
- Amelia Peabody, sculptor, breeder and philanthropist
- Rhod Sharp, BBC Radio presenter of Up All Night
- Jamie Walters, actor, musician and star of 90210

=== Celebrities ===
- Lucille Ball: 1947, arrived at Seaside park via helicopter to perform in summer theater series.
- Vivian Vance: performed in Marblehead Summer theater series.
- Marjorie Merriweather Post: visited throughout 1930s and after the war, anchoring yacht Sea Cloud off Marblehead Light.
- Walter Cronkite: 1997, for USS Constitution's 200th anniversary
- Tallulah Bankhead
- Billie Burke: Actress, best known as Glinda in The Wizard of Oz, performed in the 1955 Marblehead Summer Theatre Series
- Gloria Vanderbilt: Actress, performed at Marblehead High School Auditorium, summer theatre series
- Eva Gabor: Actress, performed in summer theatre series
- Charles Coburn: Actor, performed in summer theatre series
- Ethel Waters: American blues singer, "Stormy Weather", performed in Marblehead in 1955
- Sarah Churchill: Actress, Winston Churchill's daughter, performed in summer series

=== Writers ===
- H. P. Lovecraft visited Marblehead in 1922, an event which had profound personal effect on him. He used Marblehead as his inspiration for the fictional town of Kingsport.
- Sylvia Plath American poet, novelist, and short story writer. Visited Marblehead in July 1951.

See: Arts, Films section for actors who came for location shooting.

== Arts ==
=== Paintings ===
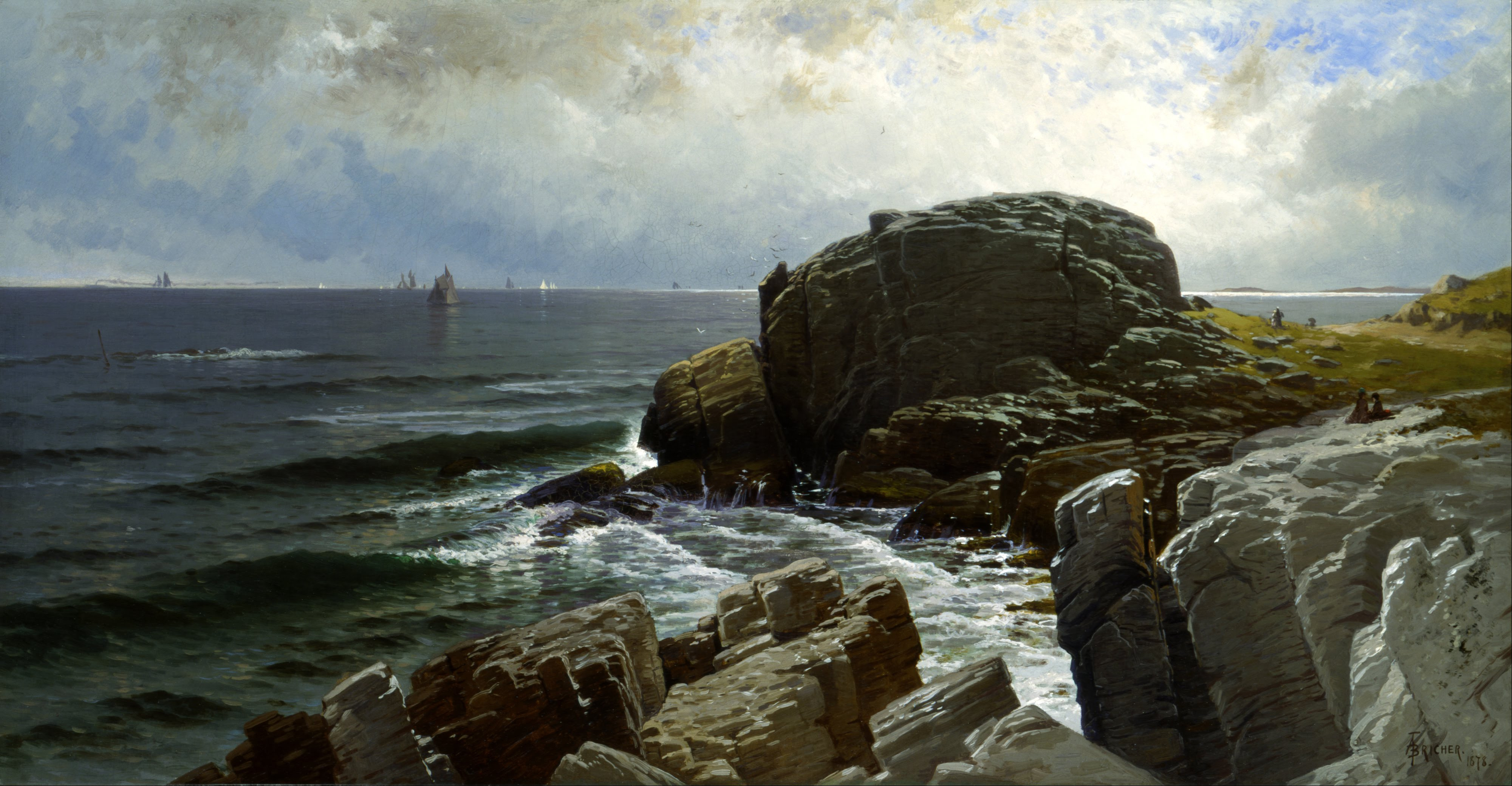
Castle Rock Marblehead, Alfred Thompson Bricher

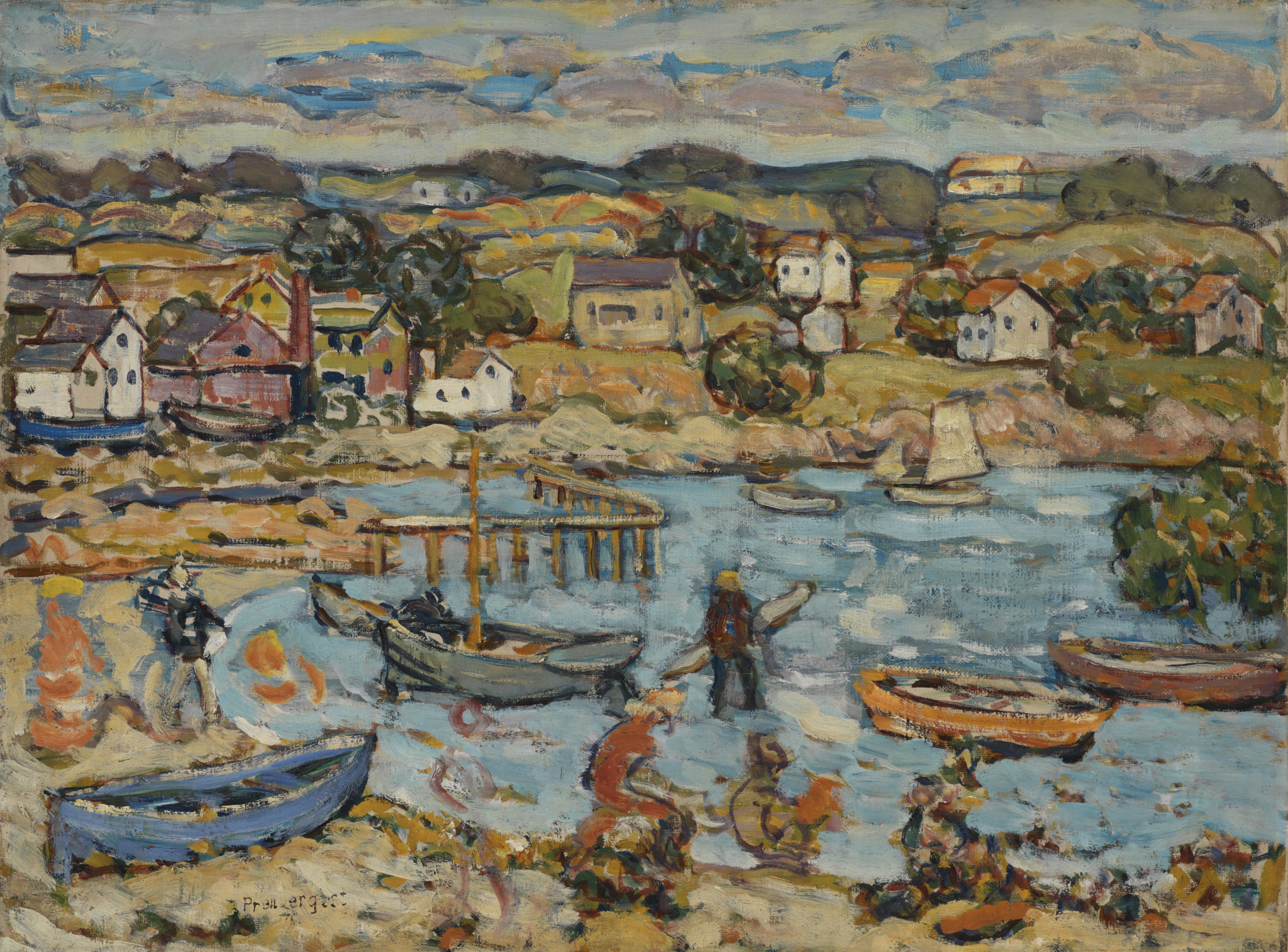
Marblehead Harbor, Maurice Brazil Prendergast

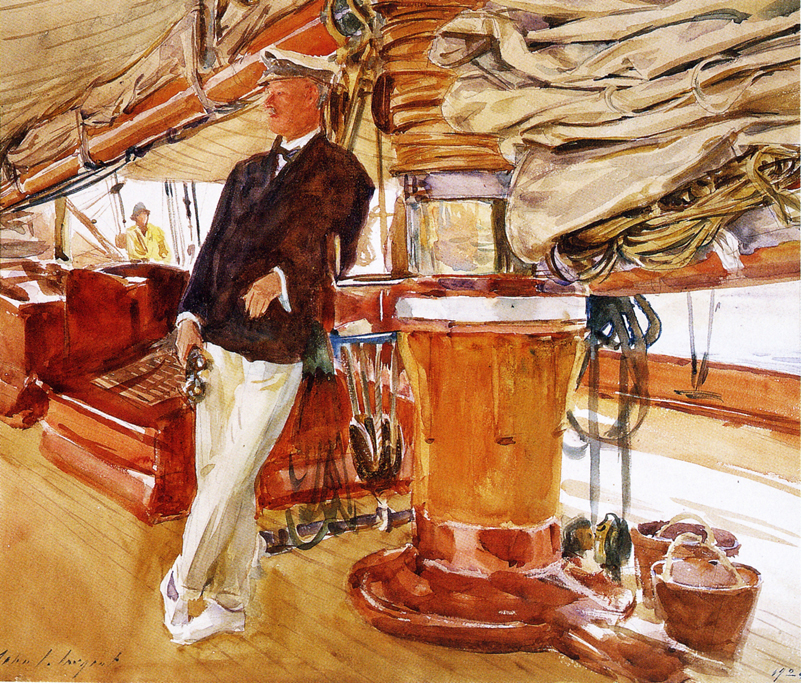
On Deck of the Yacht Constellation, John Singer Sargent

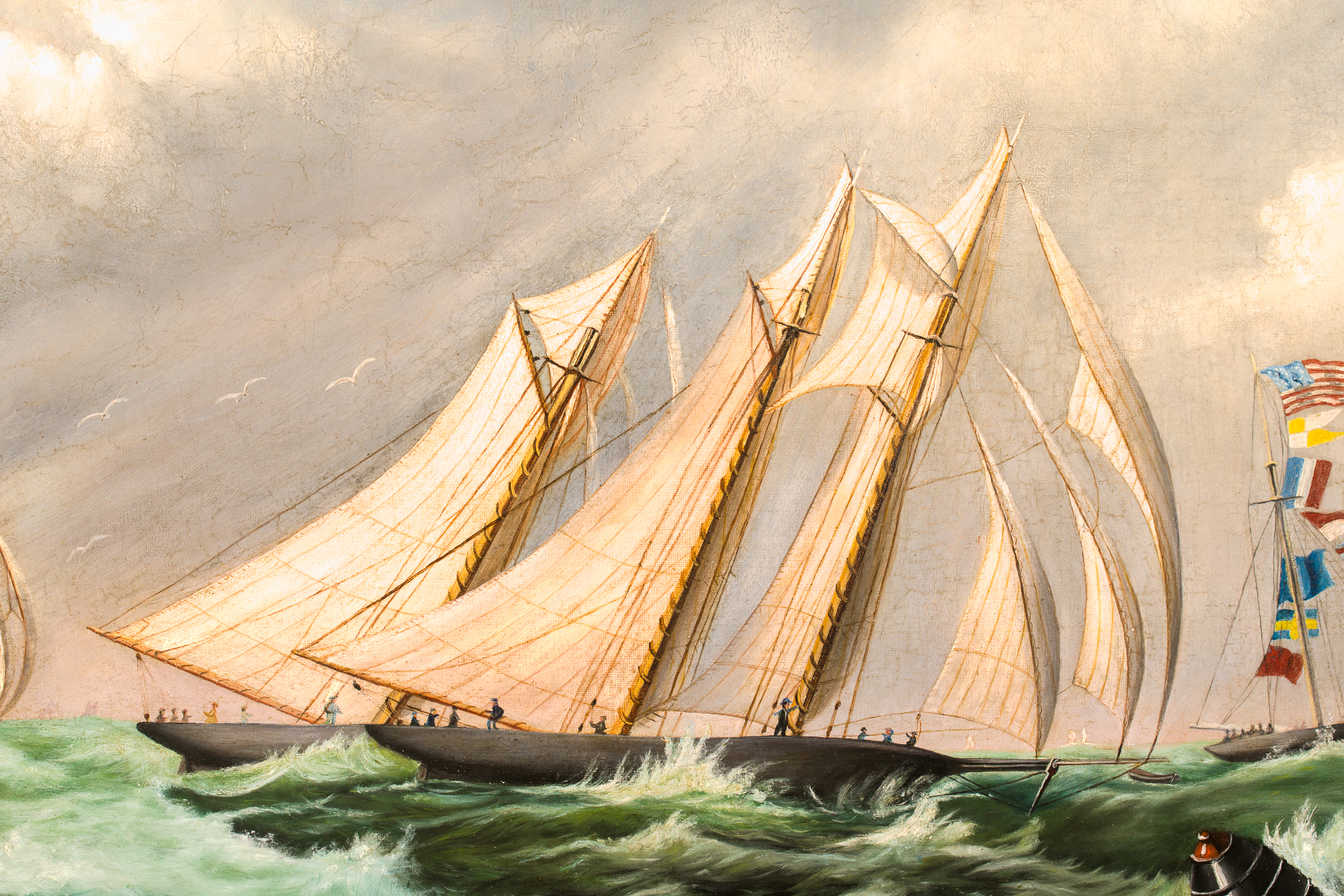
First International Yacht Race off Children's Island, M.H. Howes

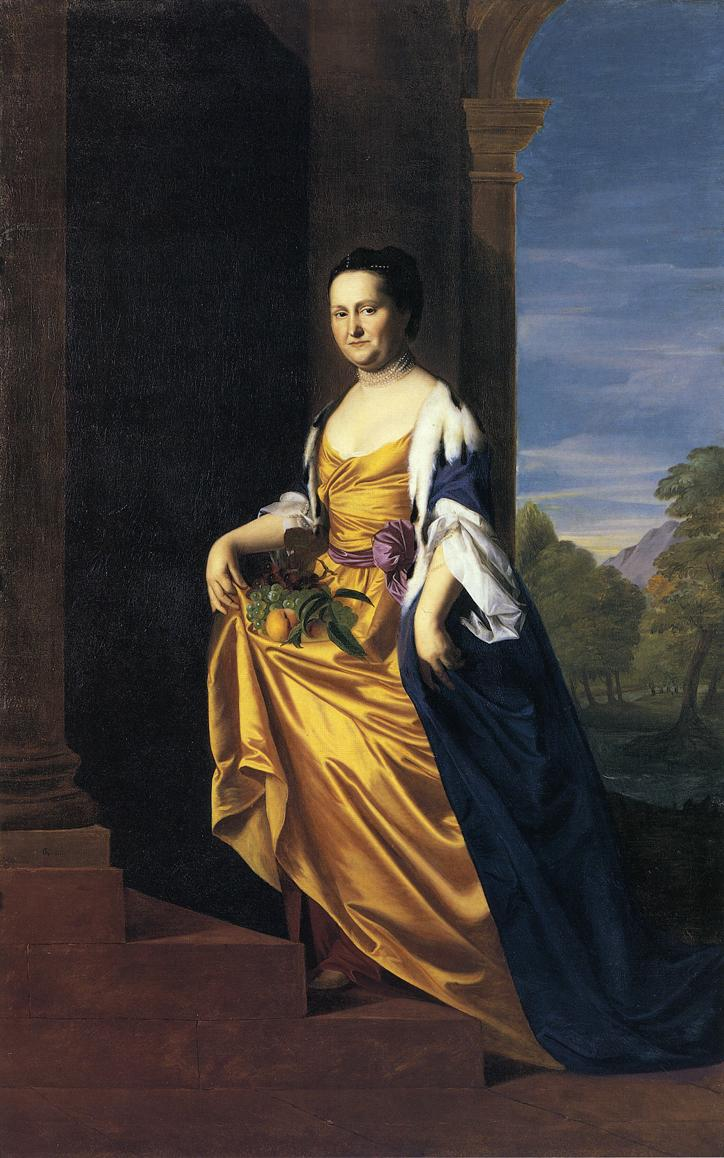
Mrs Jeremiah Lee, Martha Swett, John Singleton Copley

Notable paintings & artists depicting Marblehead scenes and figures:

- Alfred Thompson Bricher:
  - Castle Rock, Marblehead, 1878, Smithsonian American Art Museum
- John Singleton Copley
  - Jeremiah Lee, oil portrait, 1769, The Wadsworth Atheneum
  - Mrs Jeremiah Lee, Martha Swett, oil portrait, 1769, The Wadsworth Atheneum
- Clement Drew
  - Yachts Off Halfway Rock Marblehead, oil on board, 1884.
- J.O.J. Frost
  - Waterfront of Old Town, paint on masonite, 1924, Marblehead Historical Society
  - The March into Boston from Marblehead...April 16, 1861, oil on fiberboard, 1925, Peabody Essex Museum
  - The Marblehead Fishermen, oil on board, c. 1922–1928, Smithsonian American Art Museum
- Frederick Childe Hassam
  - Panorama of Marblehead, Marblehead Messenger, illustration, 1880
- John Ross Key
  - On the Coast near Marblehead
  - Marblehead, Mass, Peabody Essex Museum
- Fitz Henry Lane
  - Becalmed Off Halfway Rock, oil on canvas, 1860, Cape Ann Museum
  - Halfway Rock off Marblehead, oil on canvas, Cape Ann Museum
- Maurice Brazil Prendergast:
  - Marblehead, watercolor 1914. Museum of Fine Arts, Boston
  - Bathing, Marblehead, 1897, Museum of Fine Arts, Boston
  - Moonlight at Marblehead, c. 1907–1910
  - Marblehead Harbor, c. 1918–1920, Barnes Foundation, Philadelphia
  - Peaches Point, oil on canvas, c. 1915, Bowdoin College Museum of Art
- Arthur Quartley
  - Morning off Marblehead, oil on canvas, 1879
- John Singer Sargent
  - On deck of the Yacht Constellation, water color, 1924, Peabody Essex Museum
  - Rainy day on the deck of the yacht Constellation, water color, 1924
- George Henry Smillie
  - Near Marblehead, Mass, oil on canvas
- James David Smillie
  - At Marblehead Neck, etching, 1883, National Gallery of Art, Washington DC
  - Causeway - Marblehead Neck, etching, 1883
- Mary Bradish Titcomb
  - Marblehead Harbor, oil on canvas
  - Sunday Morning, oil on canvas, 1920
  - House in Poplars, Marblehead Mass, gouche on board
  - Rockaway Street, watercolor, 1906
  - View of Marblehead, oil on canvas
  - Sedona Hill, Marblehead, oil on canvas

=== Films ===
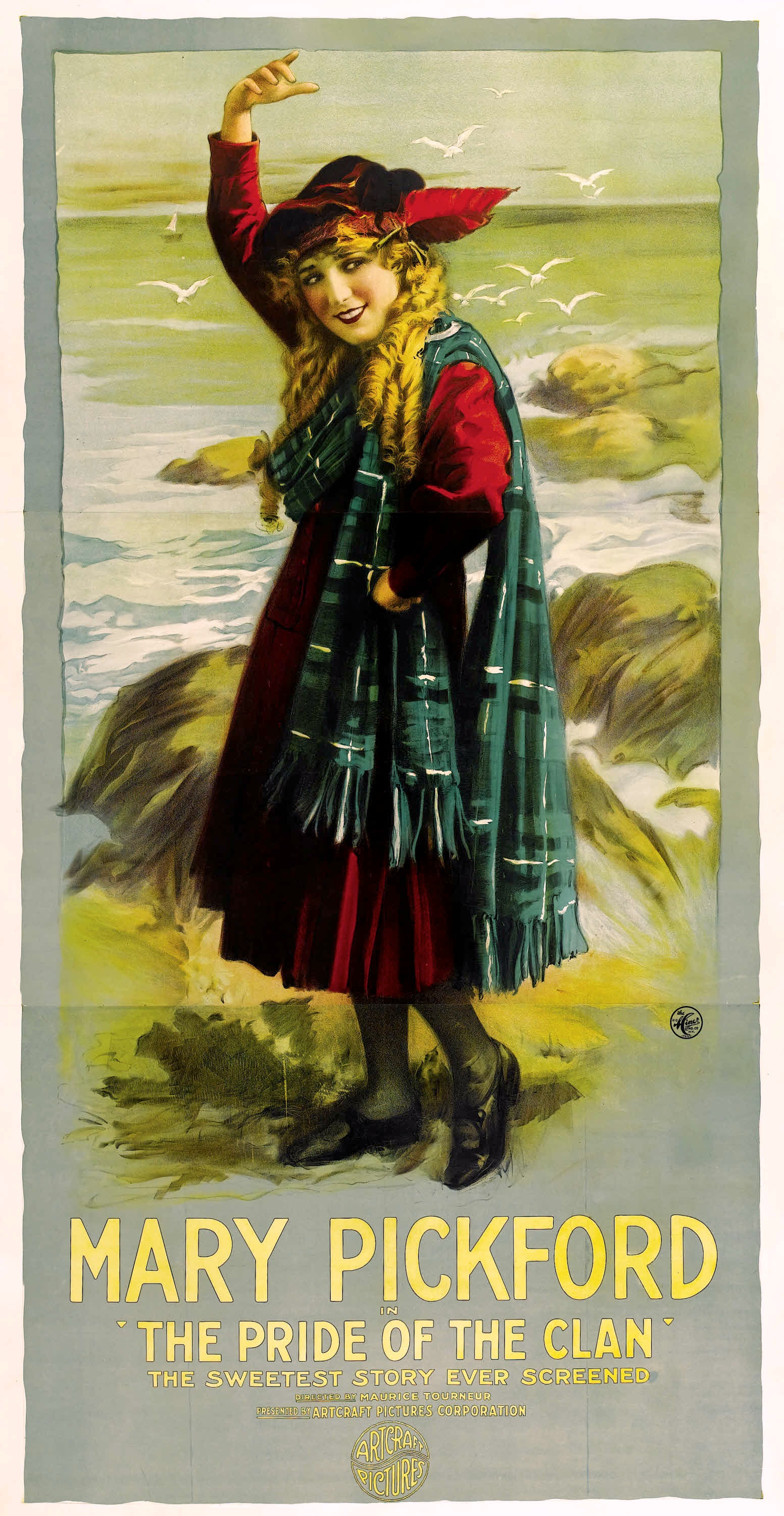
Pride of the Clan, filmed at Castle Rock

Movies filmed in Marblehead include:

- The Pride of the Clan starring Mary Pickford (1917) – Castle Rock (park transformed into Scottish village)
- Home Before Dark (1958) – "Lafayette House" (used as primary home for filming)
- Coma (1978)
- The Witches of Eastwick (1986) – Abbott Hall (used for concert scene and reveal of Jack Nicholson's character)
- The Good Son (1993)
- Hocus Pocus (1993) – Old town streets (bike ride scene), Old Burial Hill (daytime cemetery), Crocker Park (Abbott Hall bells ringing), Witches night time flyover
- Treading Water (2001)
- What's the Worst That Could Happen? (2001)was filmed in Manchester-by-the-Sea, but scenes are set in Marblehead.
- Moonlight Mile (2002)
- Grown Ups (2010) and Grown Ups 2 (2012)
- The Company Men (2010)
- Hubie Halloween(2019)
- Godmothered (2020)

=== Television ===
A television show has yet to be filmed in the town. However, Marblehead has been mentioned in the following TV series:

- Marblehead Manor (1987) was a sitcom about a wealthy Marblehead resident that ran for one season on CBS.

=== Literature ===
==== Set in Marblehead, or based on local figures ====
- The Hearth & Eagle, by Anya Seton, traces the history of Marblehead from early settlement in 1630 to modern times through the story of one family, originally from Cornwall, who eventually ran Marblehead's Hearth & Eagle Inn.
- The Death and Life of Charlie St. Cloud, by Ben Sherwood, is set in Marblehead and features the Waterside Cemetery. A film adaptation was made in 2010.
- General John Glover and His Marblehead Mariners, by George Athan Billias (1960)
- Hidden Silver, by Georgene Faulkner, Relates the story of a Marblehead family during the American Revolution
- 'Azor of Marblehead Series (1948–1960), by Maude Cowley
- Swansday at Redd's, A Marblehead Story, by Ray Cole
- Marblehead from HollyHocks to Hot Top, articles by John D Hill, Morrill S. Reynolds, Phyllis Masters, Percy L. Martin
- Marblehead's First Harbor: The Rich History of a Small Fishing Port, by Hugh Peabody Bishop and Brenda Bishop Booma
- The Lace Reader, by Brunonia Barry
- A Guide to Marblehead, by Samuel Roads Jr. (1881)
- Old Marblehead, by Samuel Chamberlain (1940)
- History and Traditions of Marblehead, by Samuel Roads Jr. (1880)
- In the Time of Worms: An Ancient Tale of Marblehead, by Kenelm Winslow Harris
- Under the Golden Cod, by 350th Anniversary book Committee detailing the history of the congregation of Marblehead Old North Church from 1635 to 1985.
- The Autobiography of Ashley Bowen (1728–1813), by Ashley Bowen
- Red On Black, A Marblehead Story, by Eben Weed
- Where Away: The Story of USS Marblehead, by George Sessions Perry and Mabel Leighton
- Marblehead: The Spirit of '76 Lives Here, by Priscilla Sawyer Lord (1972)

==== Literature influenced by Marblehead ====
- Rabbi Small, by Harry Kemelman, takes place in the fictional town of Barnard's Crossing, a place based on Marblehead. Kemelman lived in Marblehead for 50 years.
- The Jesse Stone novels: Robert B. Parker supposedly based the fictional town of Paradise, in which the novels take place, on Marblehead. Both Paradise and Marblehead are on the coast in Essex County, Cape Ann is visible from them, and each has an annual Race Week yachting event.
- Kingsport – Horror and fantasy writer H. P. Lovecraft derived great inspiration from Marblehead. Following his first visit in December 1922, he retroactively reconfigured his fictional Kingsport in its own image. As of 1920, Kingsport was an unspecified location in Rhode Island, only mentioned in passing. Lovecraft likely based the name on that of Kingstown, R.I. Lovecraft regarded his experience of visiting Marblehead in 1922, however, as life-changing. Thereafter, he based his Kingsport on Marblehead.

== Contemporary photographs of Marblehead ==
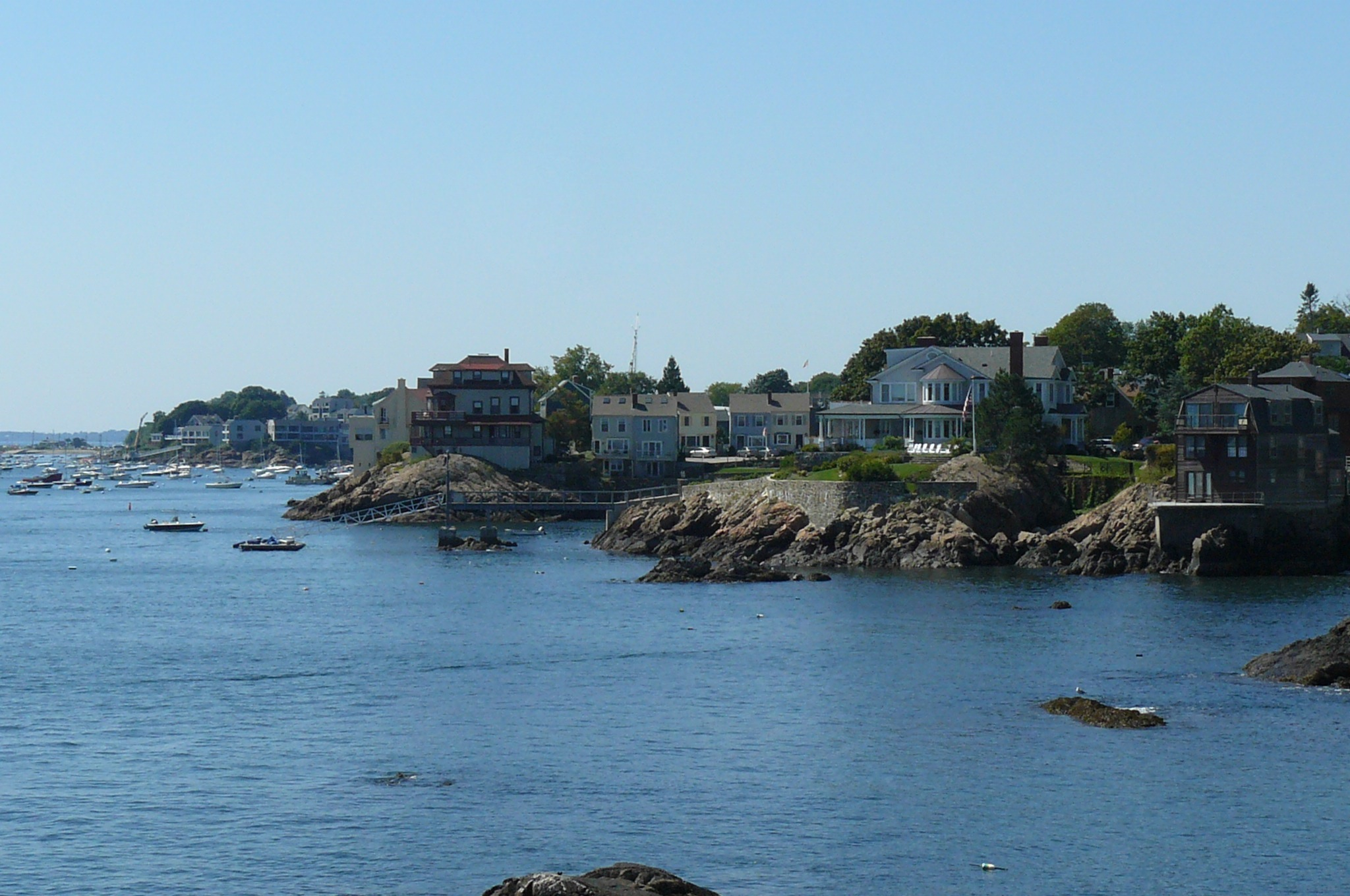
Seaside view from Fort Sewall

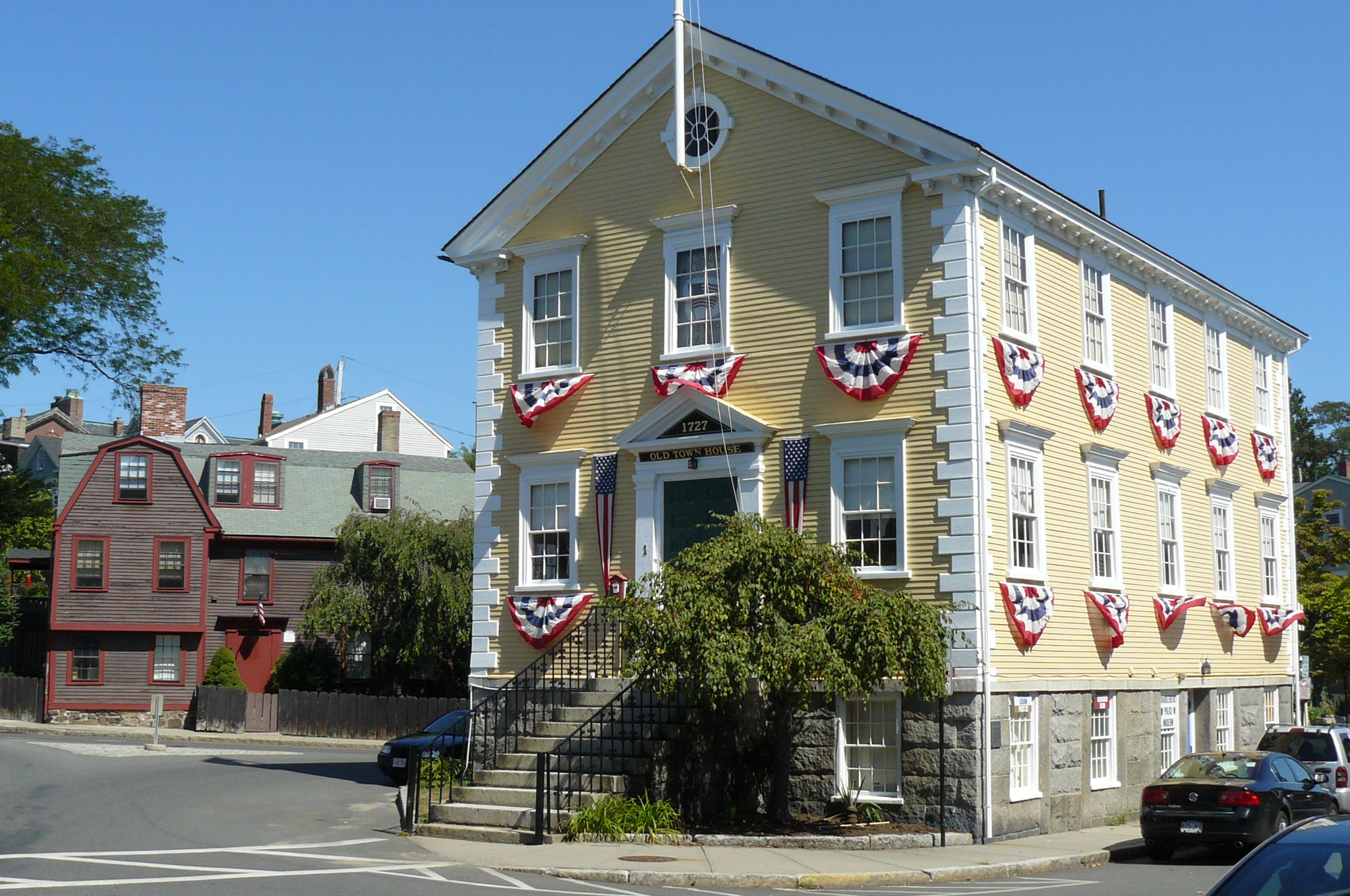
Old Town House

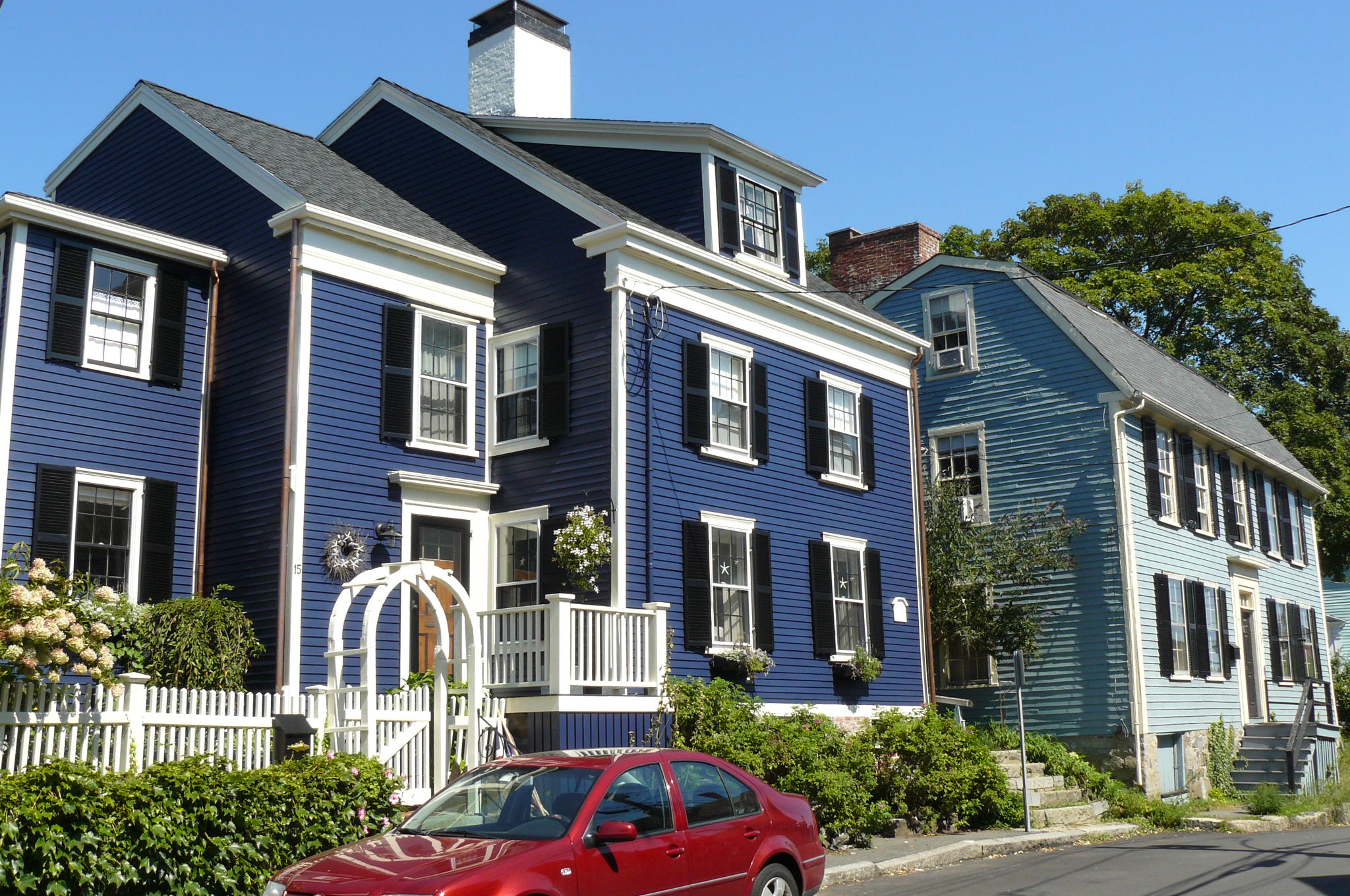
Homes on Washington Street

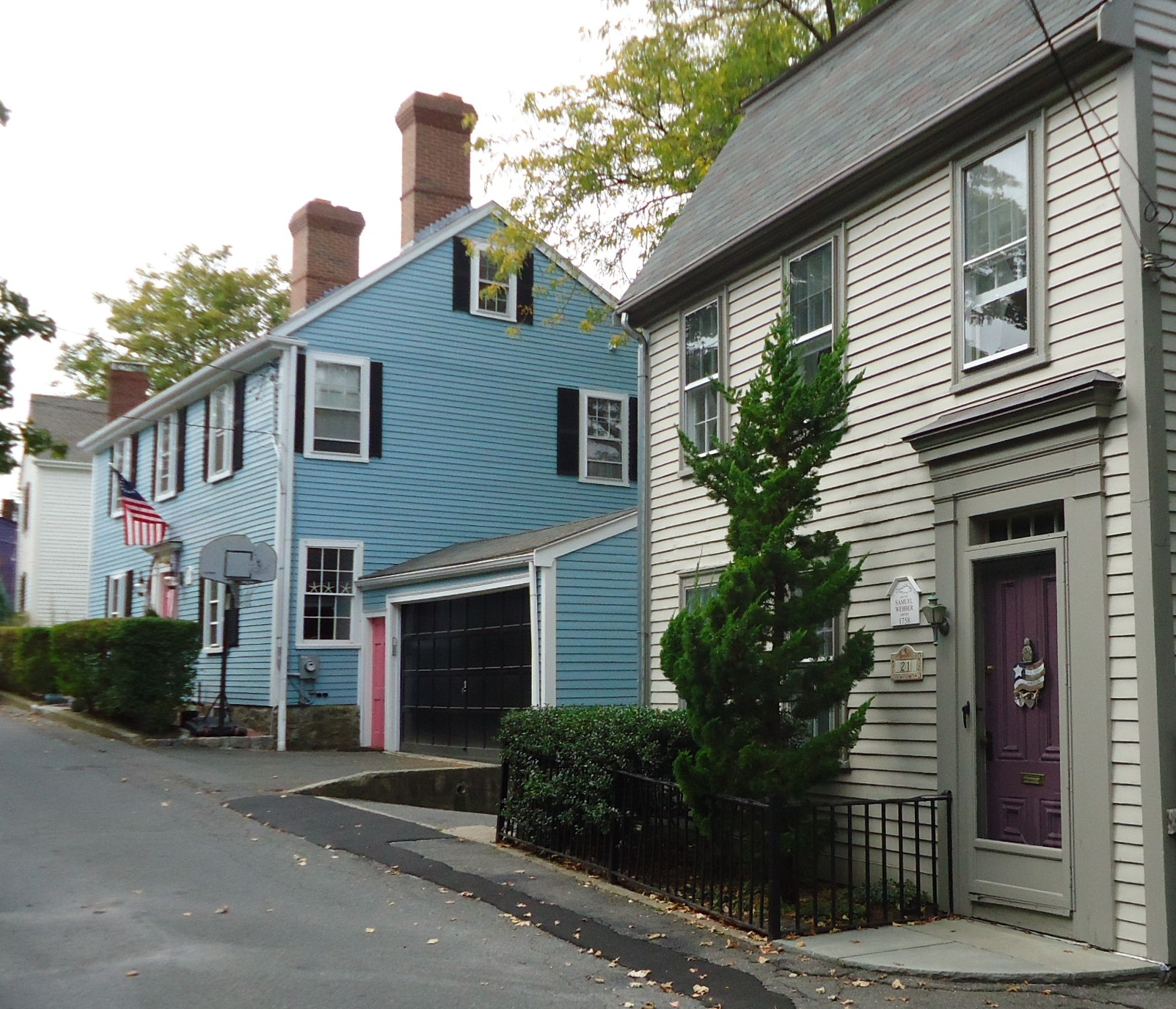
Architectural styles

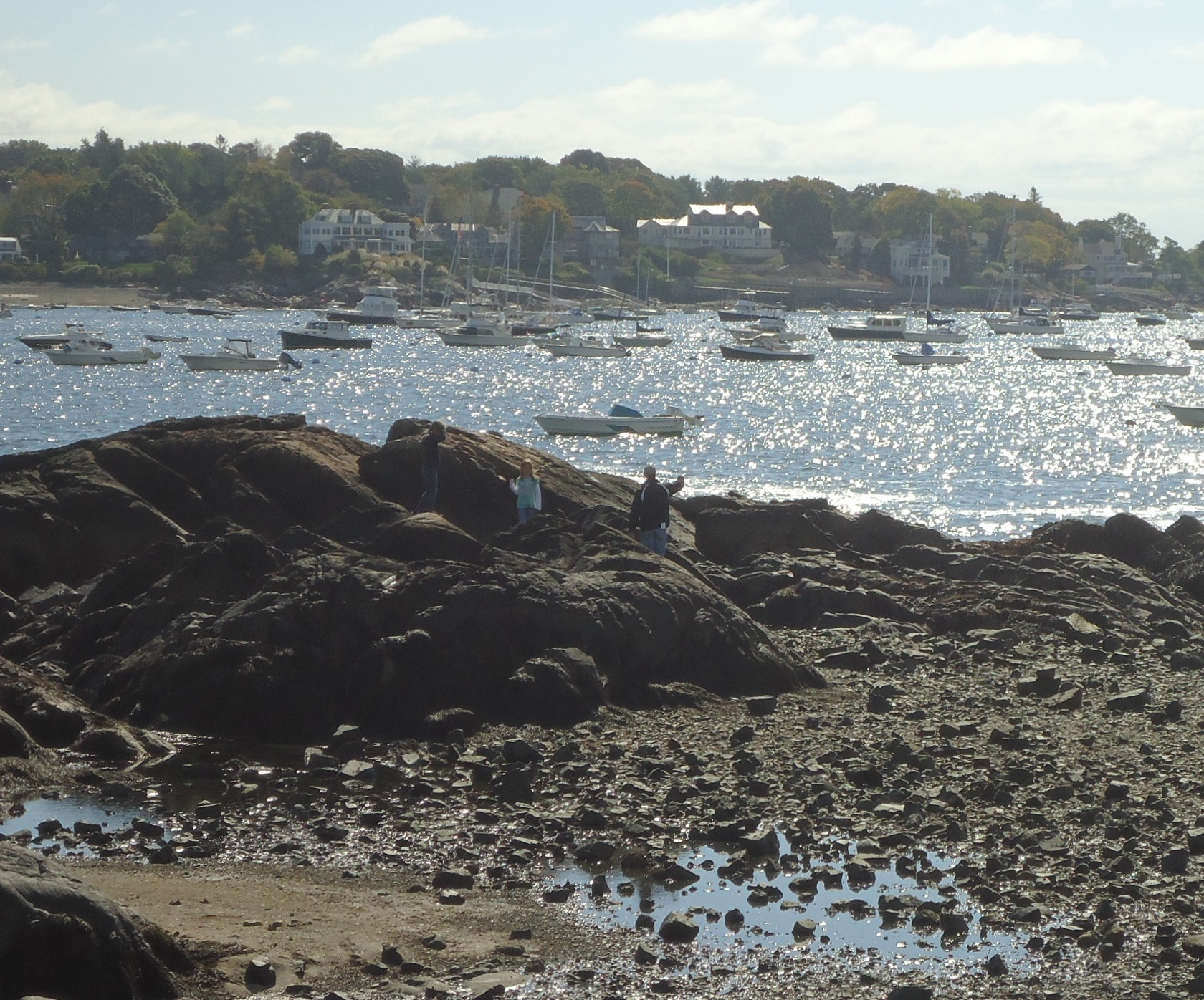
Rocks

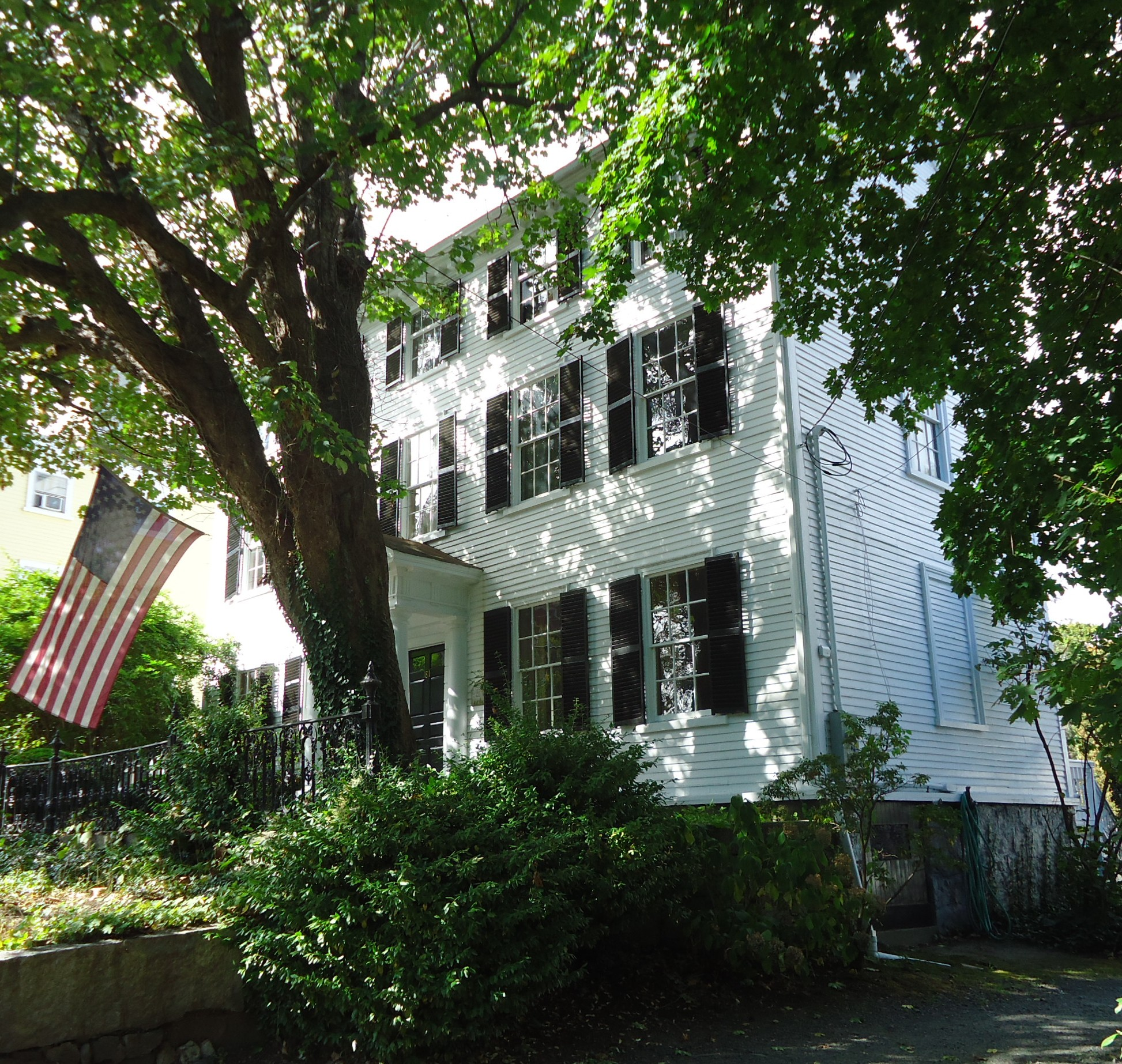
House with flag

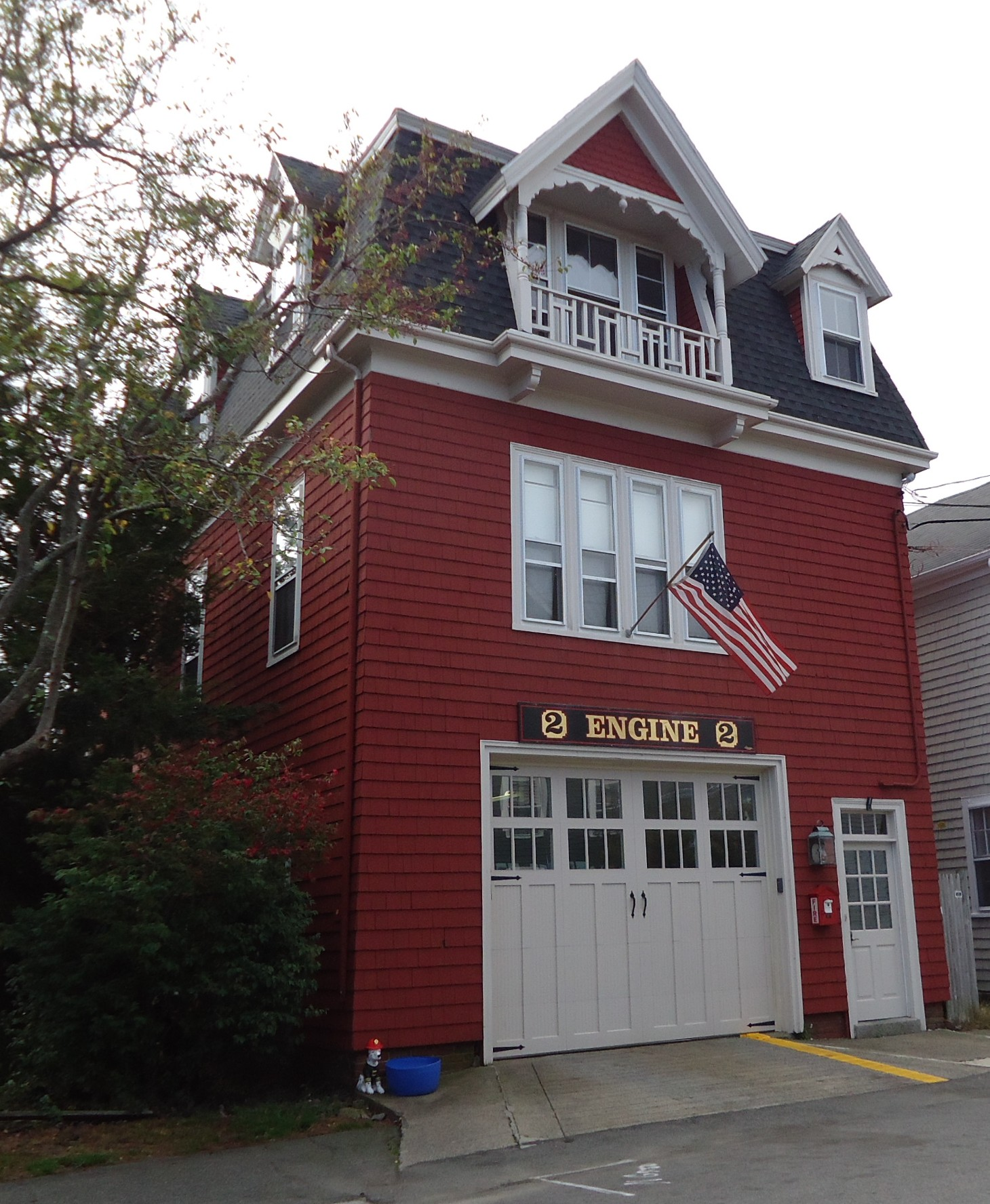
Fire station

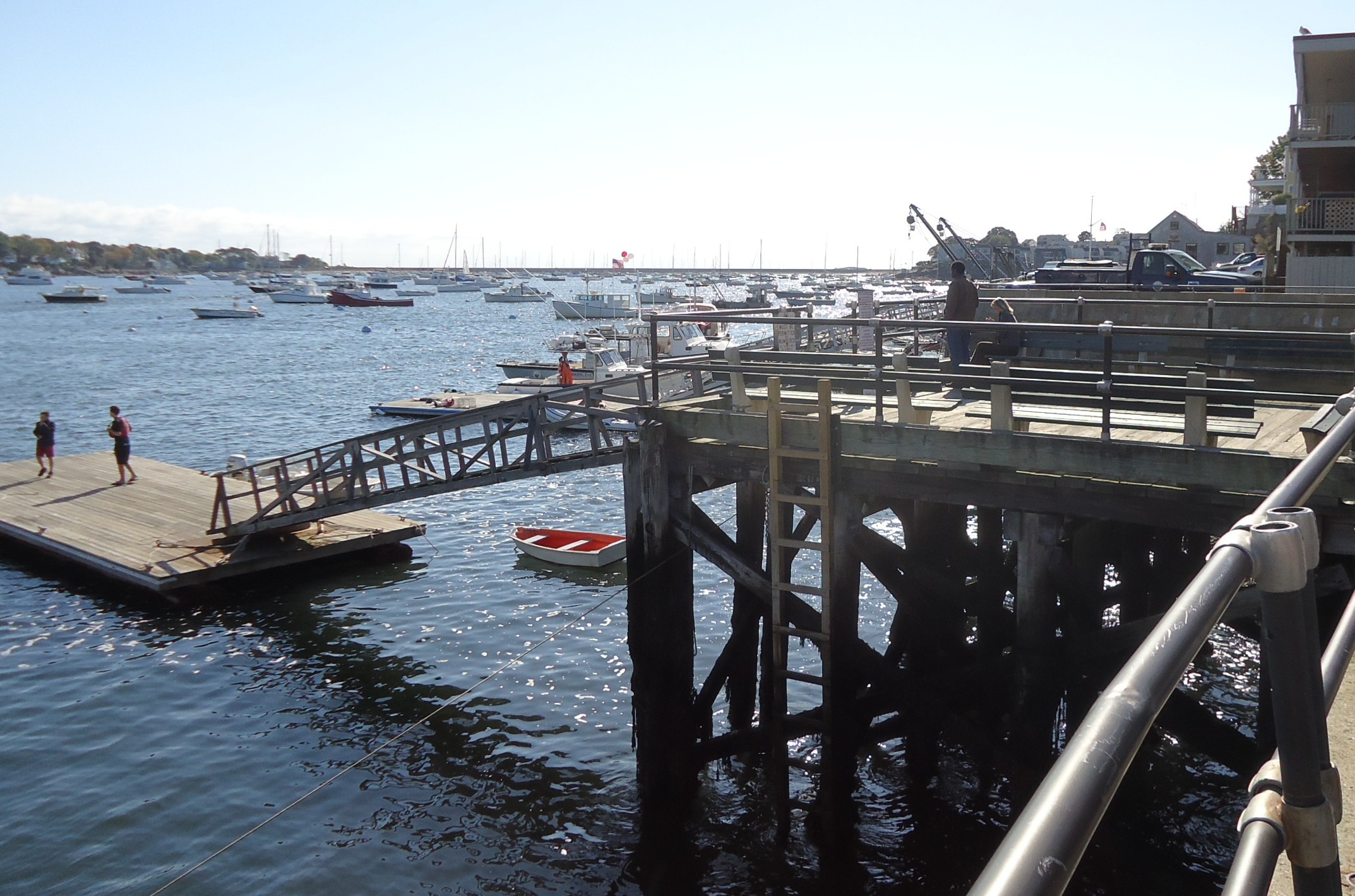
Dock

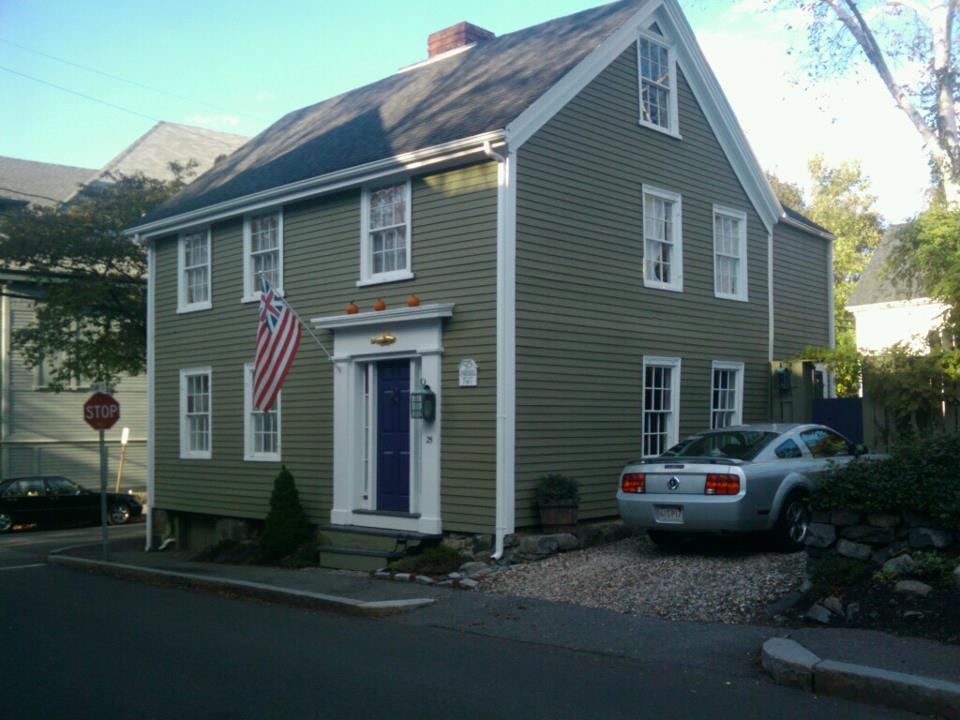
Historic home

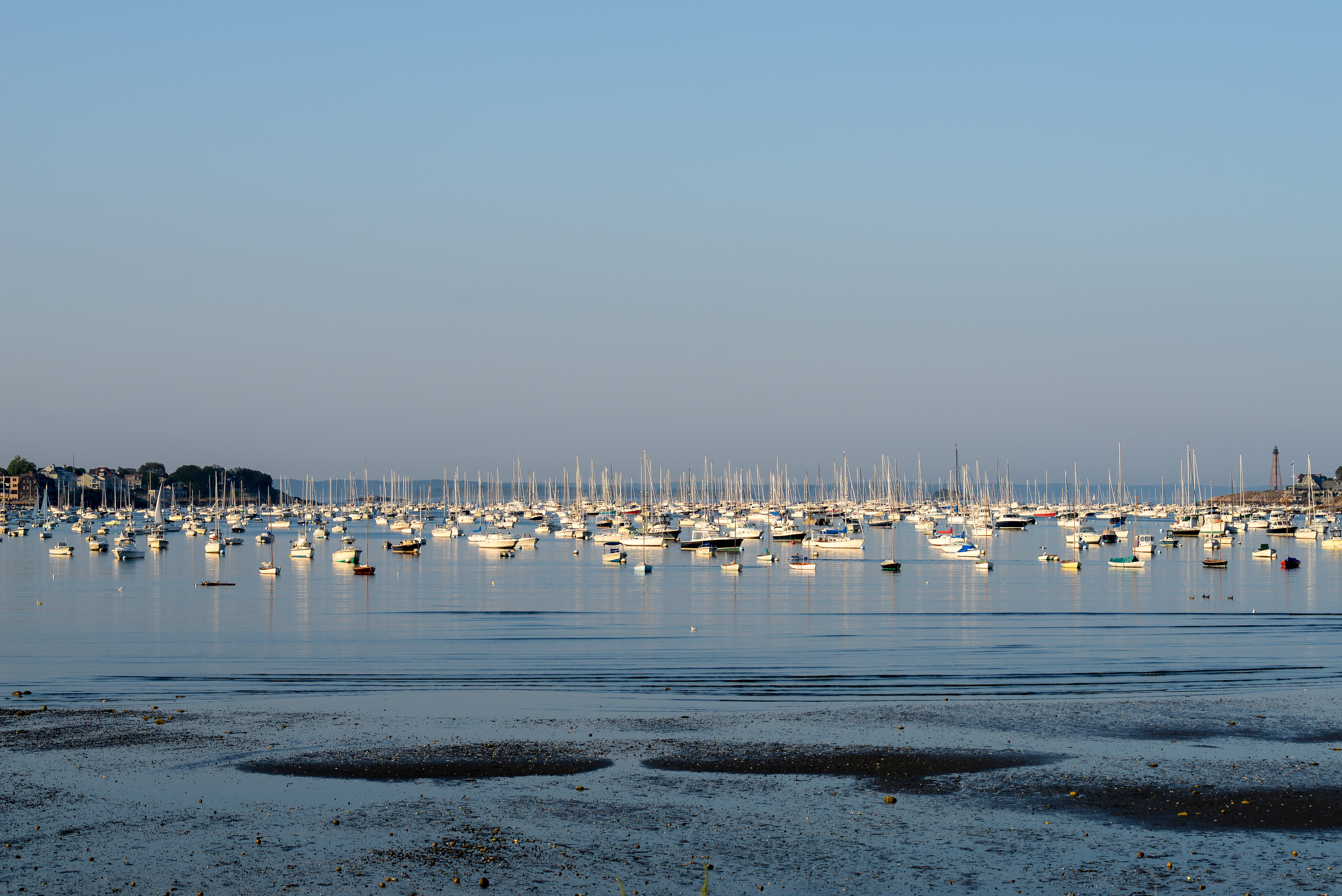
Harbor view from the causeway

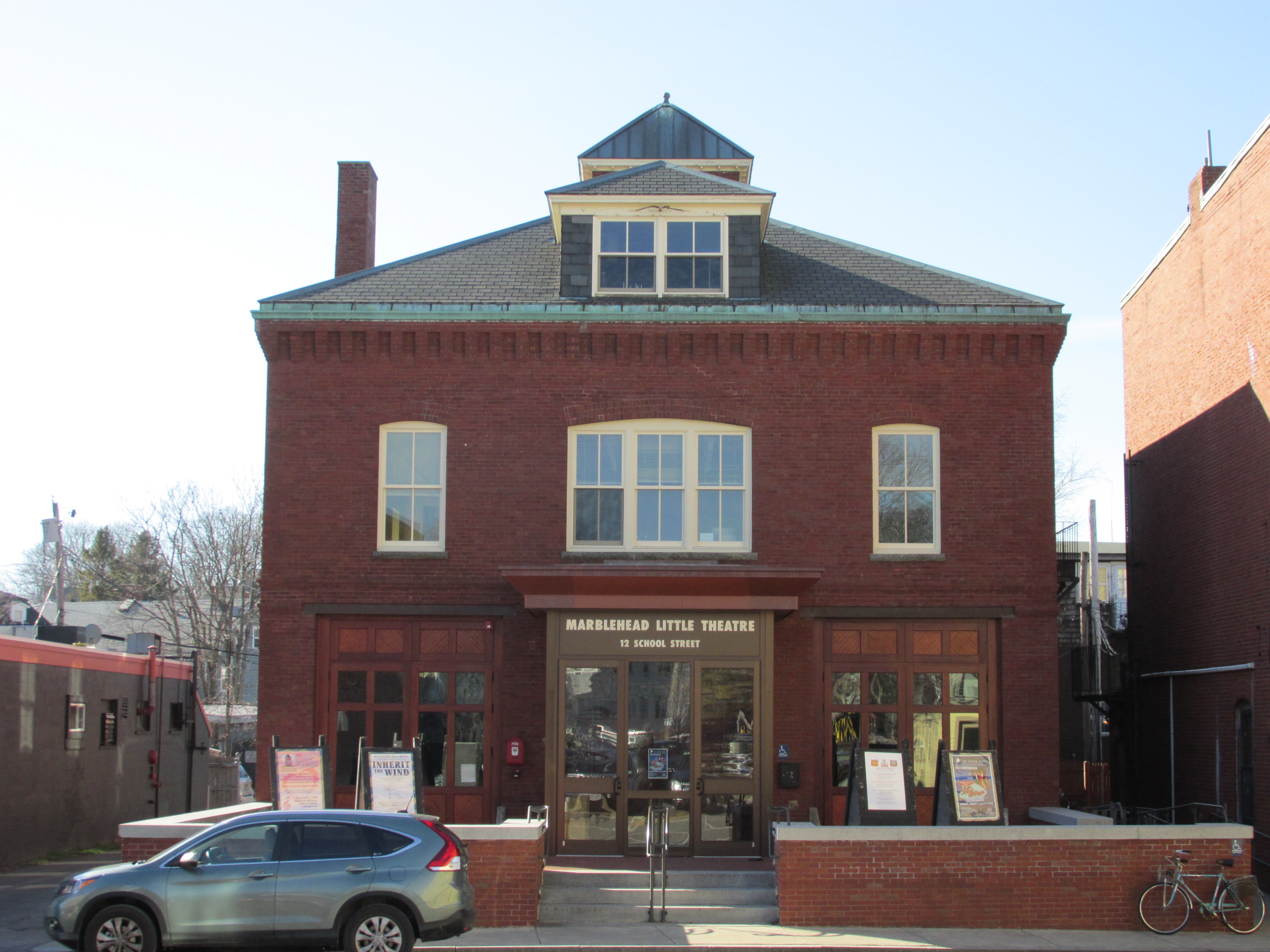
Marblehead Little Theater

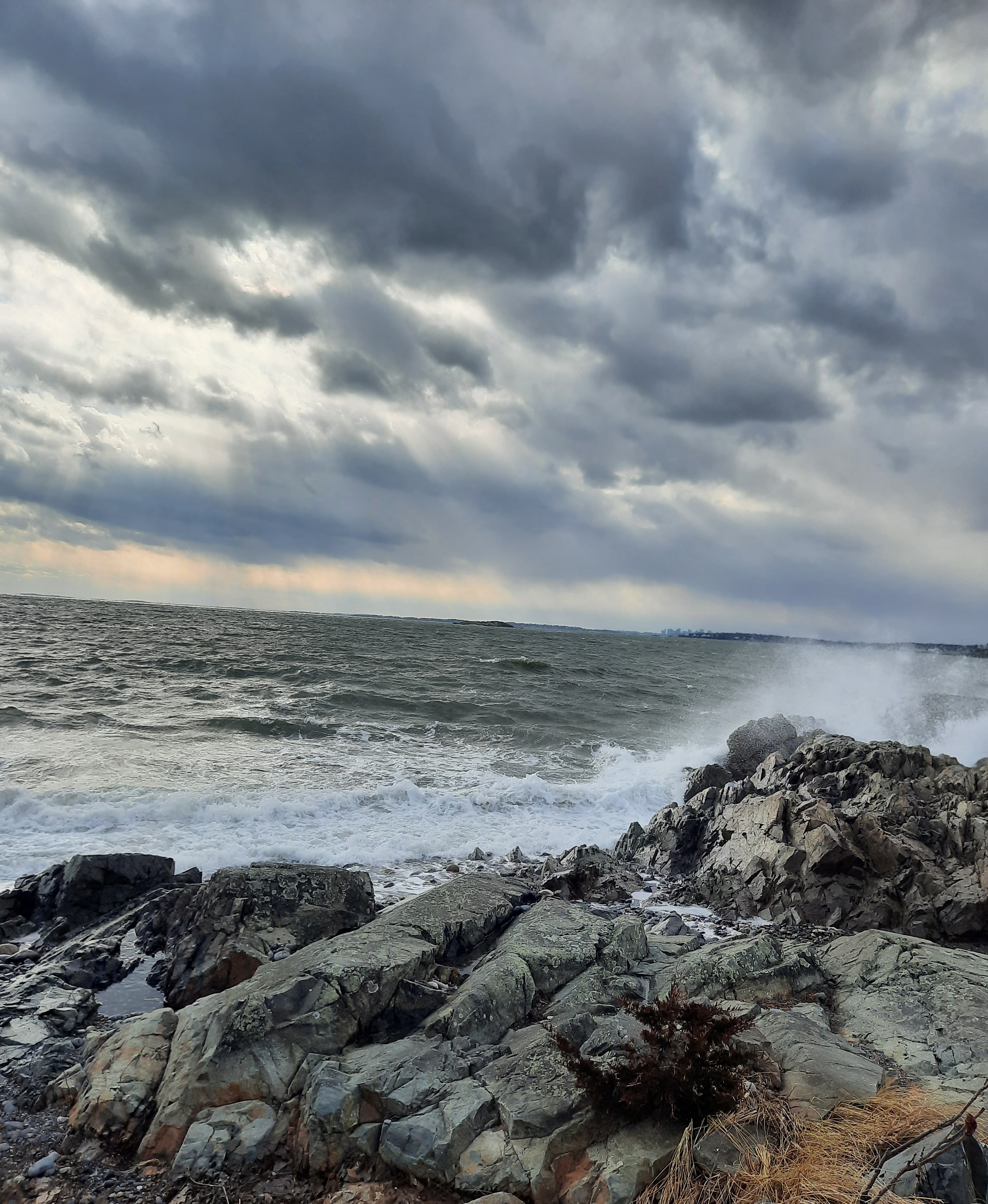
Atlantic Ocean from the causeway

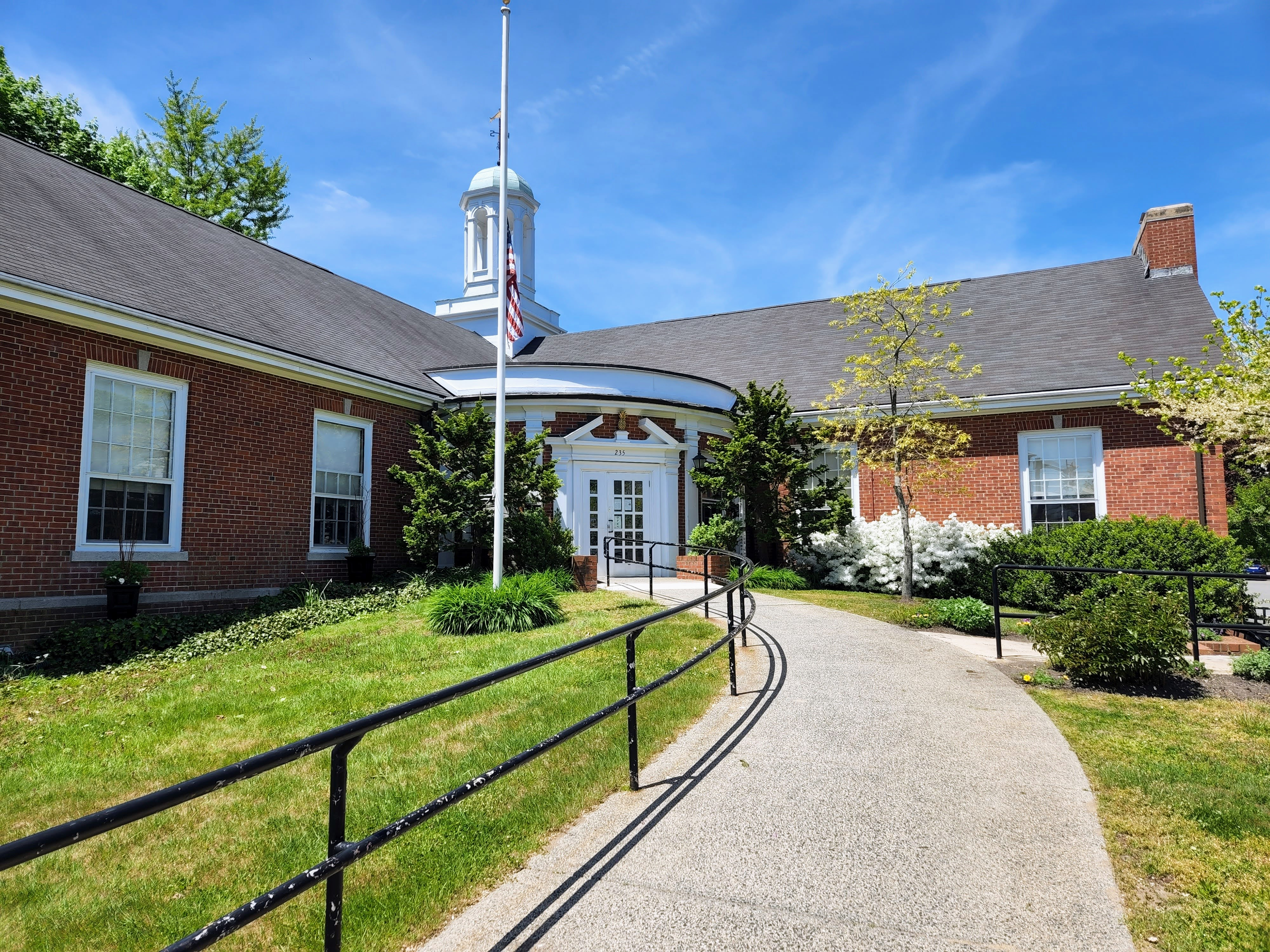
Abbot Public Library

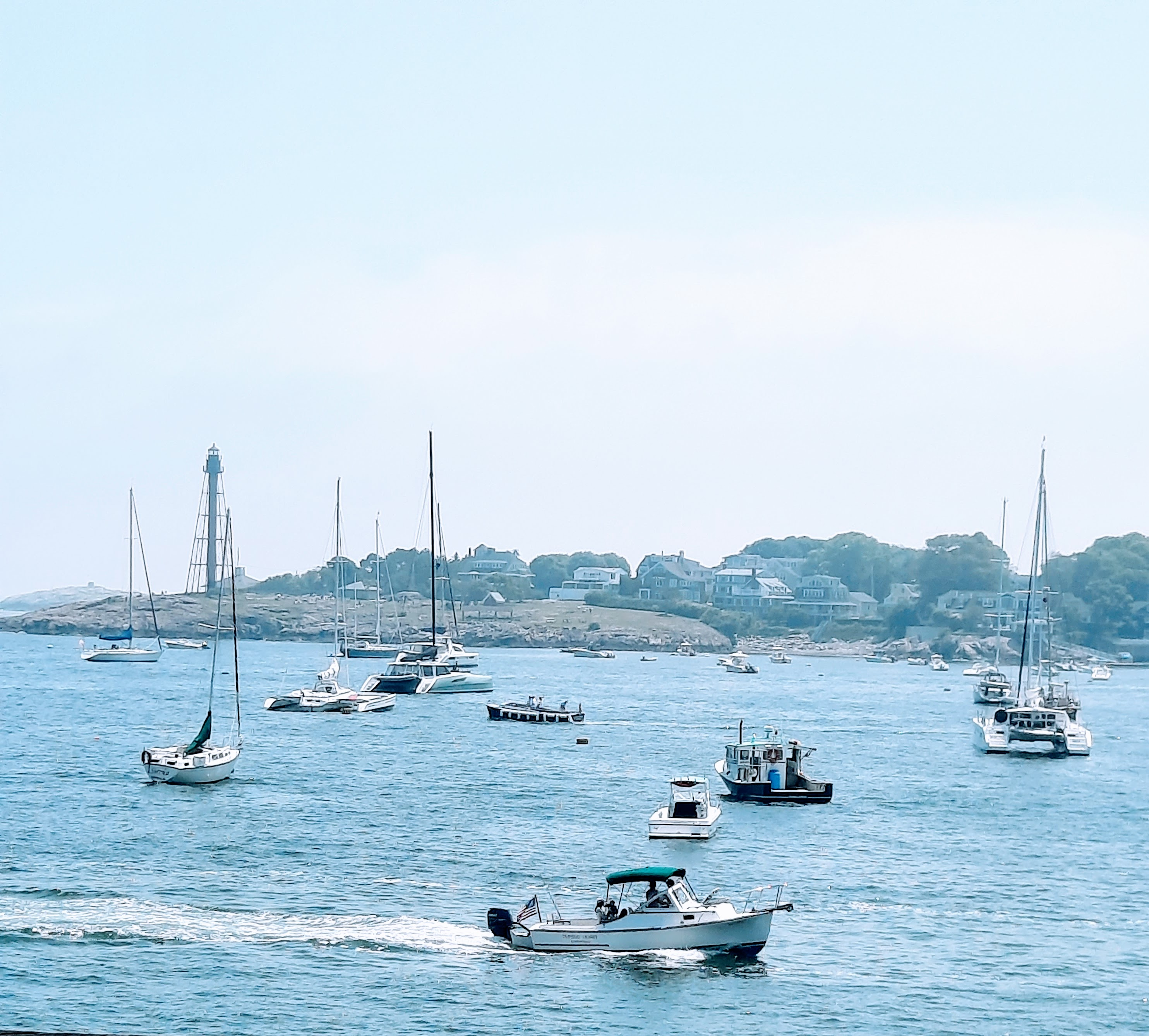
Marblehead Light

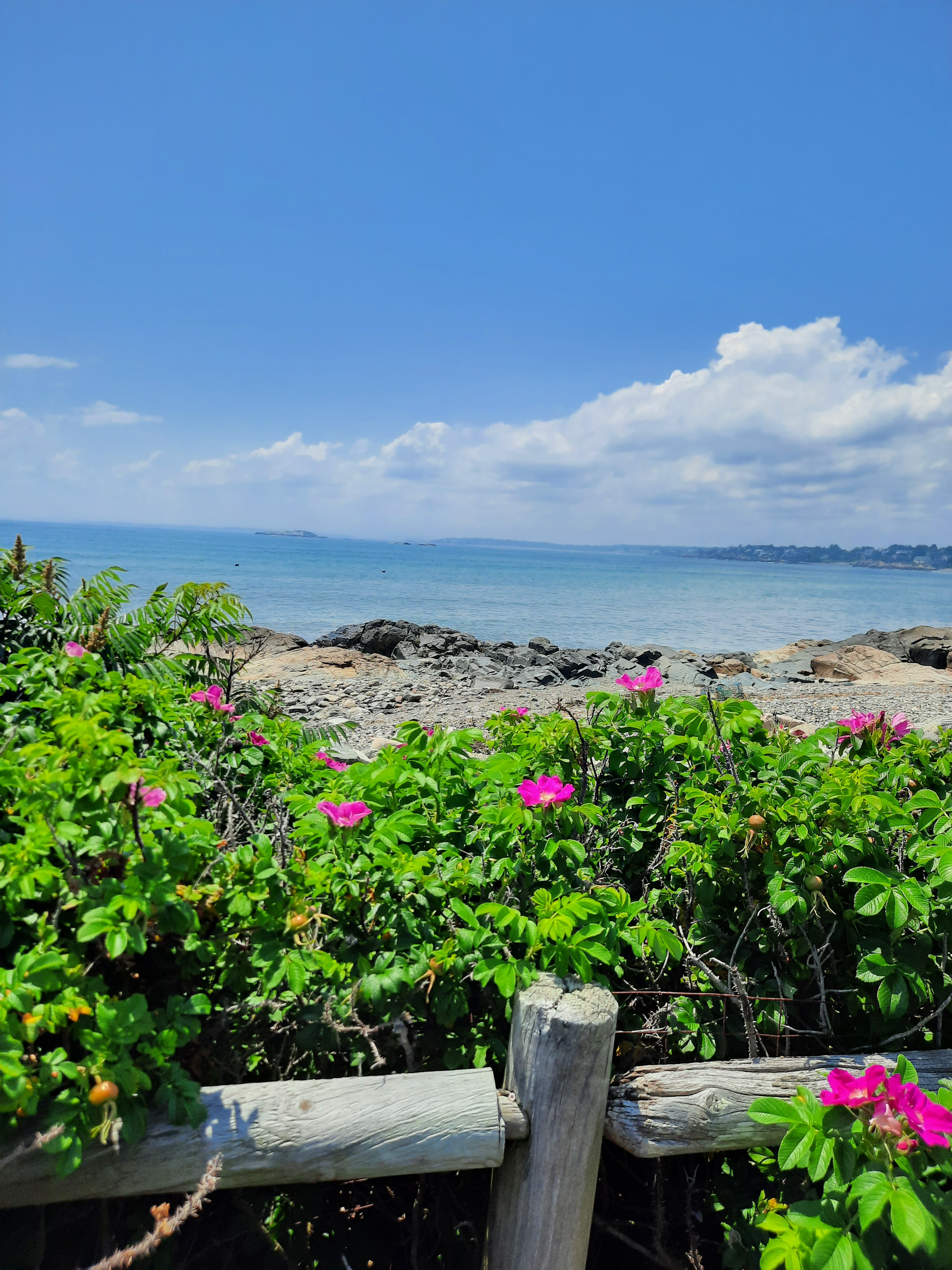
Atlantic Ocean from Neck

=== Voting history ===
At the presidential level, Marblehead leaned towards the Republican candidate in results tabulated from 1968 through 1988, but has since swung predominantly to the Democratic Party, as with many other communities in Massachusetts.

Marblehead town vote by party in presidential elections
| Year | Democratic | Republican | Third Parties |
|---|---|---|---|
| 2024 | 68.62% 9,299 | 28.89% 3,915 | 2.49% 338 |
| 2020 | 71.15% 10,128 | 26.63% 3,790 | 2.22% 318 |
| 2016 | 62.87% 8,111 | 29.14% 3,759 | 7.99% 1,031 |
| 2012 | 55.22% 6,991 | 43.52% 5,510 | 1.26% 159 |
| 2008 | 60.60% 7,513 | 37.58% 4,659 | 1.81% 225 |
| 2004 | 59.13% 7,140 | 39.38% 4,755 | 1.50% 181 |
| 2000 | 54.90% 6,486 | 37.60% 4,442 | 7.49% 886 |
| 1996 | 55.74% 6,497 | 36.32% 4,233 | 7.94% 925 |
| 1992 | 46.36% 5,844 | 33.61% 4,237 | 20.02% 2,524 |
| 1988 | 47.54% 5,858 | 51.31% 6,322 | 1.14% 141 |
| 1984 | 42.14% 5,122 | 57.76% 27,021 | 0.10% 12 |
| 1980 | 27.73% 3,415 | 49.04% 6,038 | 23.22% 2,860 |
| 1976 | 38.96% 5,014 | 56.82% 7,311 | 4.22% 543 |
| 1972 | 42.25% 5,396 | 55.89% 7,139 | 1.86% 238 |
| 1968 | 48.09% 5,389 | 51.91% 5,816 | 2.27% 254 |
