= Spirit of '76 =

Spirit of '76 commonly refers to:

- Spirit of '76 (sentiment), the patriotic sentiment engendered by the American Revolution

Spirit of '76 may also refer to:

== Music ==
- Spirit of '76 (album), a 1975 album by Spirit
- "Spirit of '76" (song), a 1976 song by Booty People
- "Spirit of '76", a song on the 1985 album Strength by Welsh band The Alarm
- "Spirit of '76", a song on the 2018 album Book of Bad Decisions by rock band Clutch

== Film ==
- The Spirit of '76 (1917 film), a silent film directed by Frank Montgomery
- The Spirit of '76 (1990 film), starring David Cassidy and Redd Kross

== Books ==
- Spirit of '76 (Marvel Comics), the name of a fictional comic book character from Marvel Comics, first introduced in 1977
- Spirit of '76 (Harvey Comics), the name of a fictional comic book character from Harvey Comics

== Games ==
- Spirit of 76 (pinball), a pinball game by Gottlieb
- The Spirit of '76, a pinball game by Mirco Games, Inc.

== Other uses ==
- The Spirit of '76 (painting), a painting by Archibald Willard
- Spirit of '76, the official journal of the Sons of the American Revolution at the turn of the 20th century
- Spirit of '76 (mango), a named mango cultivar that originated in south Florida
- Spirit of '76 (airplane), Richard Nixon's name for Air Force One
