= Gary (mango) =

Mango cultivar

Mangifera 'Gary'
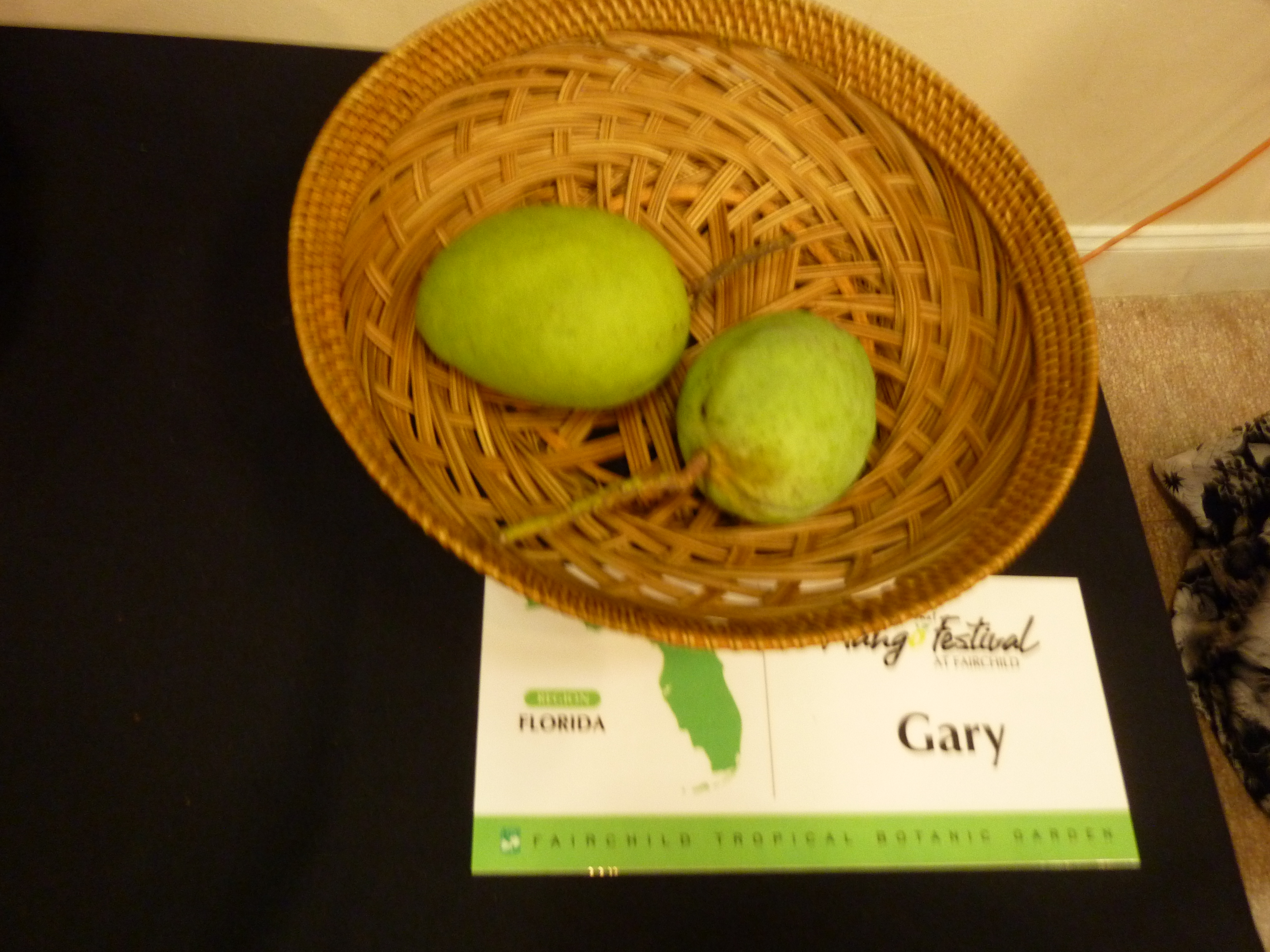
- Photo of Gary mangoes at the Fairchild Tropical Botanic Garden's 2010 International Mango Festival in Miami, Florida
- Genus: Mangifera
- Species: Mangifera indica
- Hybrid parentage: 'Carrie' × unknown
- Cultivar: 'Gary'
- Breeder: Gary Zill
- Origin: Florida, USA

The 'Gary' mango is a named mango cultivar that originated in south Florida.

== History ==
Gary was a seedling of the Carrie mango. It was named after horticulturalist and nursery owner Gary Zill. This continued a tradition of mangoes named after members of the Zill family, which include the Zill, Dot, and Carrie cultivars as well.

The Gary has been sold as a nursery stock tree in Florida. Gary trees are planted in the collections of the USDA's germplasm repository in Miami, Florida and the Miami-Dade Fruit and Spice Park in Homestead, Florida.

== Description ==
The fruit is small, averaging less than a pound, is of ovoid shape and has yellow skin.

== See also ==
- List of mango cultivars
