= Abbot Hall =

Abbot Hall may refer to:

- Abbot Hall Art Gallery, Kendal, Cumbria, England
- Abbot Hall (Marblehead, Massachusetts), US
- Abbot Hall (Phillips Exeter Academy), Exeter, New Hampshire, US
