= Julie (mango) =

Mango cultivar

Mangifera 'Julie'
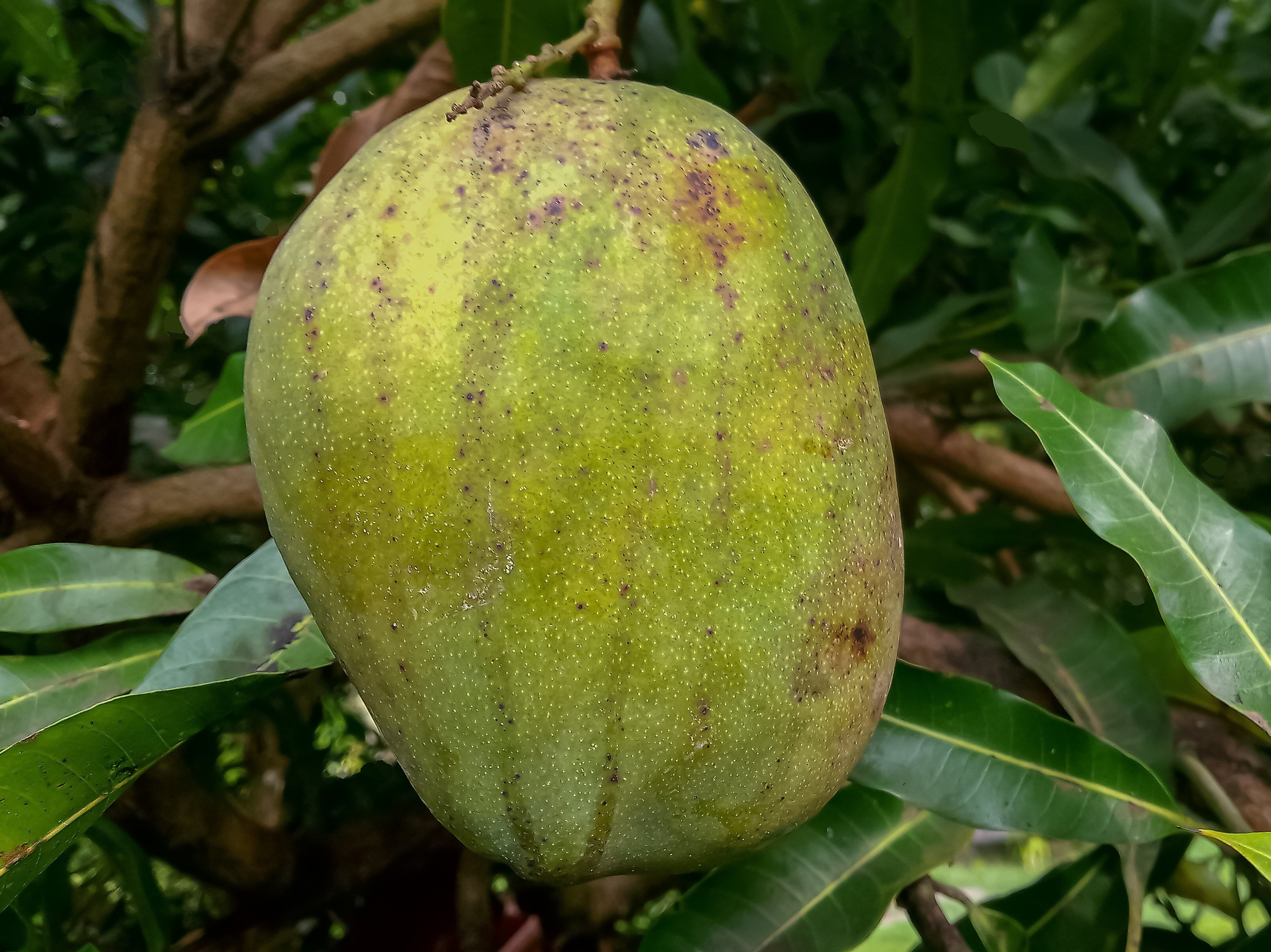
- Genus: Mangifera
- Species: Mangifera indica
- Cultivar: 'Julie'

The 'Julie' mango, also called 'Saint Julian', is a named mango cultivar that was made popular in the Caribbean. It is considered to be one of the best mangoes in the Caribbean.

== History ==
The origins of 'Julie' are uncertain but recent genetic studies show that it possibly descended from cultivars introduced to the Caribbean through Jamaica and Trinidad from Réunion, although its monoembryonic trait suggests it is descended from the Indian line of mangoes.

'Julie' was recognized for its outstanding flavor and growth. Most importantly it is known as the second best mango in the Caribbean (second to ten pound/donkey stones). It was introduced to the United States via south Florida by Lawrence Zill, a nurseryman and horticulturalist known for producing new mango varieties. Several Florida varieties are descended directly or indirectly from Julie, including 'Sophie Fry', 'Gary' and 'Carrie'. 'Julie' is also the parent of 'Graham', a variety from Trinidad.

The cultivar proved to be difficult to adapt to the humid climate of Florida, however, and was very susceptible to fungus, making it unsuitable for commercial growing. Nevertheless, the variety was sold as nursery stock for home growing and continues to be done so on a limited scale. It remains a popular variety in the West Indies, where it is often referred to as 'Saint Julian' mango.

'Julie' trees are part of the collections of the USDA's germplasm repository in Miami, Florida, the University of Florida's Tropical Research and Education Center in Homestead, Florida, and the Miami-Dade Fruit and Spice Park, also in Homestead.

== Description ==
The fruit is small, averaging less than a pound in weight at maturity. Skin color is green with some crimson blush. The fruit has a somewhat unusual shape that is ovate with a distinctive flattened side. The flesh is juicy and not fibrous, with a deep orange color and a very rich flavor. It contains a monoembryonic seed. In Florida, the fruit typically ripen from June to July.

The tree is famous for its small dwarfing growth habit. 'Julie' trees are very slow growing and in South Florida is able to maintain a height around 10 feet without pruning. In the Caribbean, however, there are 'Julie' mango trees that are over 30 feet tall.

The 30th legislature of the United States Virgin Islands passed a resolution declaring the 'Julie' mango as the "Virgin Islands Fruit of Choice".
