= JOJ =

JOJ may refer to:

- Doris Lake Aerodrome, an ice runway in Nunavut, Canada
- Jack Off Jill, an American rock band

Media

- JOJ Plus, a Slovak television channel
- TV JOJ, a Slovak television channel

People

- John Owen-Jones (born 1971), Welsh musical theatre actor and singer
- Johnnie O. Jackson (born 1971), American bodybuilder
- J. O. J. Frost (1852–1928), American artist
- J. O. J. Okezie (1923–2002), Nigerian doctor and politician
