= Spirit of '76 (sentiment) =

Patriotic sentiment of the American Revolution

The Spirit of '76 is a patriotic sentiment typified by the zeitgeist surrounding the American Revolution. It refers to the attitude of self-determination and individual liberty made manifest in the U.S. Declaration of Independence.

== Meaning ==
The Spirit of '76 is a sentiment explored by Thomas Jefferson. According to the text published at Monticello, "The principles outlined in the Declaration of Independence promised to lead America—and other nations on the globe—into a new era of freedom. The revolution begun by Americans on July 4, 1776, would never end. It would inspire all peoples living under the burden of oppression and ignorance to open their eyes to the rights of mankind, to overturn the power of tyrants, and to declare the triumph of equality over inequality."

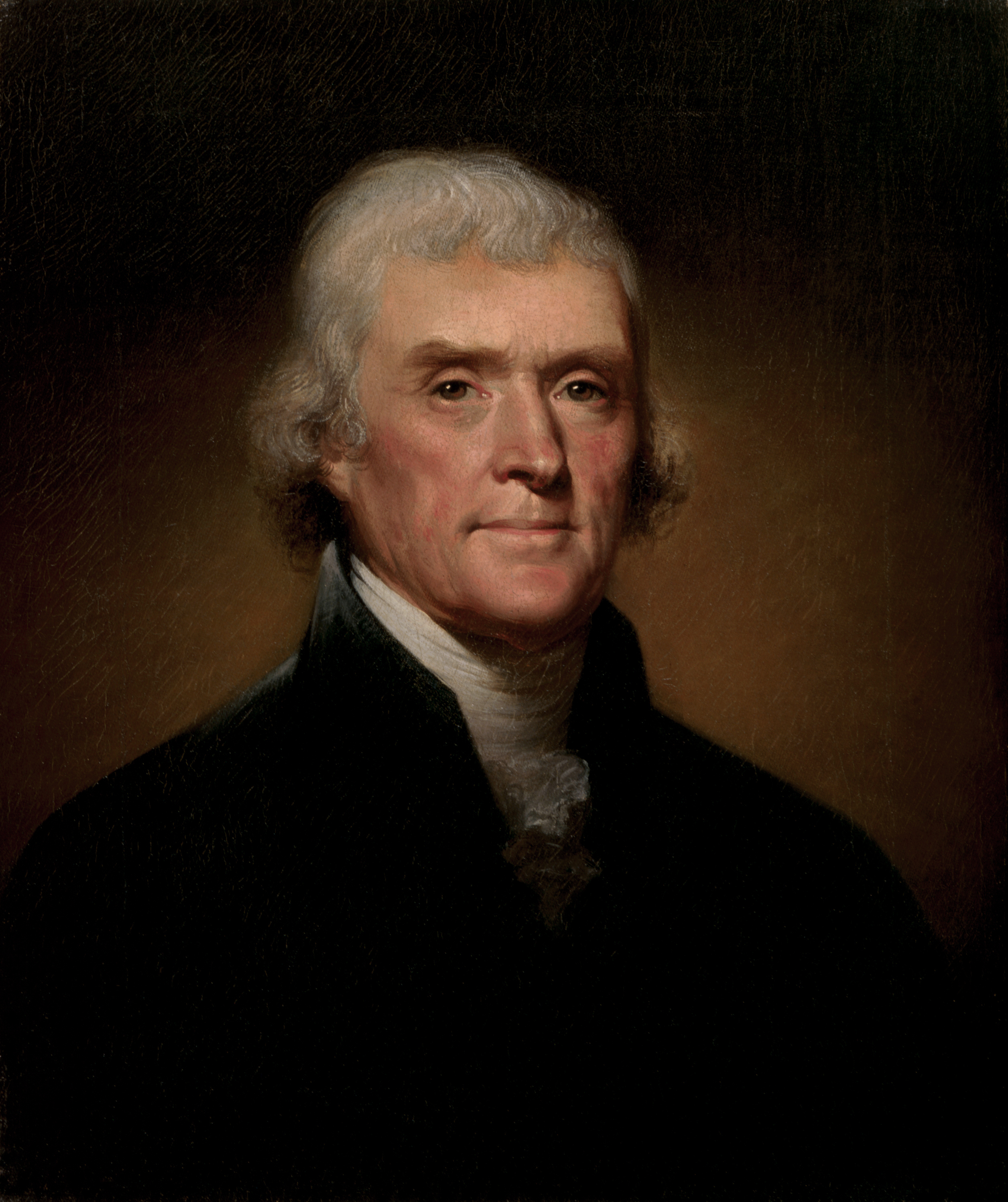
Portrait of Thomas Jefferson by Rembrandt Peale, c. 1800

Thomas Jewett wrote that at the time of the American Revolution, there was "an intangible something that is known as the 'Spirit of '76.' This spirit was personified by the beliefs and actions of that almost mythical group known as the Founding Fathers, and is perhaps best exemplified by Thomas Jefferson."

Jefferson and the Second Continental Congress believed the Spirit of '76 "included the 'self-evident' truths of being 'created equal' and being 'endowed by their Creator with certain inalienable rights' including 'life, liberty, and the pursuit of happiness.'"

According to the New York Times, in a review of What Kind of Nation: Thomas Jefferson, John Marshall, and the Epic Struggle to Create a United States:

Jefferson's core conviction was that what might be called "the spirit of '76" had repudiated all energetic expressions of government power, most especially power exercised from faraway places, which included London, Philadelphia or Washington. In terms of domestic policy, he believed the states were sovereign and the federal government established by the Constitution was, as he put it, 'a foreign government.' Marshall's core conviction was that the spirit of '87 had trumped the spirit of '76, transforming the loose confederation of states into a coherent nation guided by a duly elected federal government empowered to make laws for all the American people.

According to the Adam Smith Institute, "The spirit of '76 was animated by the desire for personal freedom, both in our relations with others and in our transactions with them... Ultimately, if Americans are to restore constitutionally limited government instituted to guarantee their personal liberty, then they must revive the Spirit of '76."

== Usage ==
In an 1806 court case, a Philadelphia judge wrote in his opinion: "General and individual liberty was the spirit of '76."

The Spirit of '76
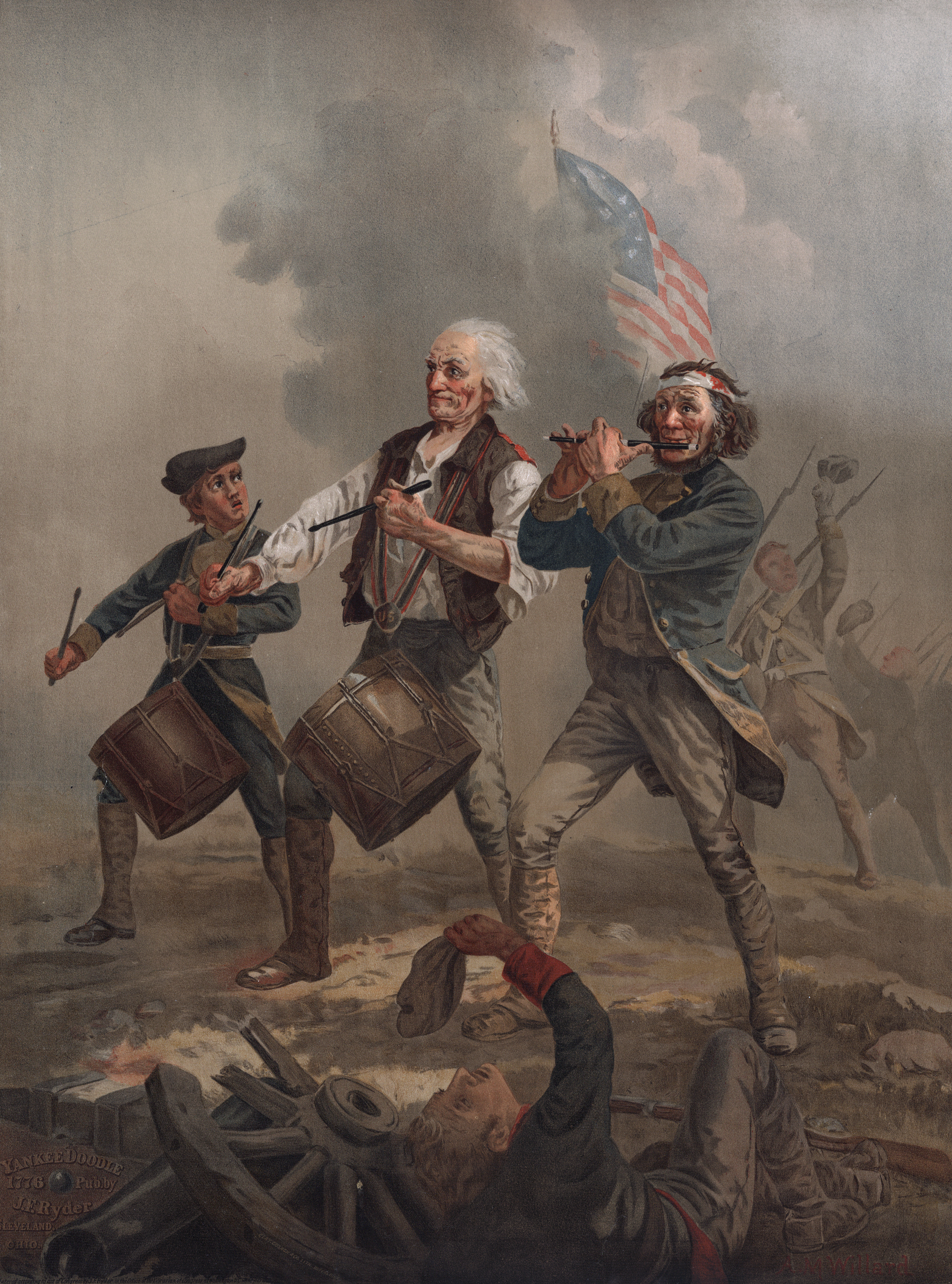
- Artist: Archibald MacNeal Willard
- Year: 1875
- Type: Oil
- Location: Abbot Hall in Marblehead, Massachusetts

The Spirit of '76 is a well-known painting by the Ohio artist and Union Civil War veteran Archibald Willard. The painting, originally titled Yankee Doodle, was created in 1875 for the Centennial Exposition. The piece acquired the name "Spirit of 76" while it was on tour in Boston. The painting was initially commissioned to be "semi-humorous," but the death of Willard's father, the model for one of the painting's figures, changed the direction of its tone. It depicts three soldiers of the American Revolutionary War. Though one of them is wounded, the soldiers march on with spirit and determination. The painting is on display at Abbot Hall in Marblehead, Massachusetts. Elizabeth Cady Stanton wrote of the spirit of '76 in reference to traveling to Philadelphia to celebrate the Centennial Exposition in 1876.

In 1843, the historian Mellen Chamberlain wrote that the spirit of '76 was embodied by Levi Preston, a veteran of the American Revolutionary War. Chamberlain asked Preston, then aged 91, "Why did you go to the Concord Fight, the 19th of April, 1775? My histories tell me that you men took up arms against 'intolerable oppression.'" Preston responded:

Oppressions? I didn't feel them. I never saw one of those stamps, and always understood that Governor Bernard put them all in Castle William. I am certain I never paid a penny for one of them. Tea tax! I never drank a drop of the stuff; the boys threw it all overboard. We read only the Bible, the Catechism, Watt's Psalms and Hymns, and the Almanack. Young man, what we meant in going for those redcoats was this: we always had governed ourselves, and we always meant to. They didn't mean we should.

In an 1899 speech, Liberty, Eugene V. Debs remarked: "Manifestly, the spirit of '76 still survives. The fires of liberty and noble aspirations are not yet extinguished."

According to the Library of Congress, a 1915 postcard titled "Did I Save My Country for This!" "Calls forth the spirit of 1776 to support women's rights—particularly the right to vote. While women march for suffrage rights, George Washington is shown exclaiming, "Did I save my country for this!"

L. Lloyd MacDonald wrote that "in 1776, a small group of thoughtful but defiant men gave new meaning to the definition of independence. Its embryo–a vibrant spirit of heart and mind known to many as 'the Spirit of '76."

Ira Moore delivered a speech at Oxford in 1822 titled American Independence. In the speech's postscript, he wrote that the speech "was written, principally, for an audience of intelligent, Republican farmers. Its object is what ought to be the object of all Fourth of July orations, to inculcate the republican principles, and to cherish the patriotic spirit of '76, and not the party spirit of 1814, which brought our country to the verge of destruction."

John Patrick Diggins wrote that after John Adams "went from being a revolutionary optimist to a constitutional pessimist, one who believed that liberty required controls and that the people needed to be protected, even from themselves...he came to be regarded as less than loyal to the 'Spirit of '76' and the very meaning of a republic."

Diggins also wrote that Abraham Lincoln "took the Declaration, which Jefferson regarded as a scientific document, interpreted it as a sacred text, and in the process of doing so he sacralized the whole meaning of the Spirit of '76." Further, "It was Lincoln's deepest conviction that the ideological significance of the American Revolution expressed itself in the Declaration and that the Spirit of '76 endowed America with its meaning and purpose in human history."

In 2009, John P. Resch authored Suffering Soldiers: Revolutionary War Veterans, Moral Sentiment, and Political Culture in the Early Republic, in which he wrote... "Veterans, particularly regular troops, became the principal symbols of the spirit of '76 and models of national character."

The Spirit of '76, along with Custer's Last Stand and the Battle of the Alamo, has been noted as representing "moral and spiritual meaning that can motivate individuals and societies."

In a 2001 book titled Harmonizing Sentiments: The Declaration of Independence and the Jeffersonian Idea of Self-Government, Hans L. Eicholz wrote... "The spirit of '76 has been lost—and with it so much else."

In 2011, academic Daren Jonescu argued that "The Tea Party represents the modern incarnation of the Spirit of 1776." Other commentators have tied modern manifestations of the Spirit of 1776 to conservative sentiment.

Ron Grossman, writing for the Chicago Tribune in 2001, opined that the spirit of '76 is often lost in the fanfare over the Fourth of July, noting that "historians and descendants of the first American citizens wonder if modern celebrations--from food fests and rock concerts to fishing tournaments and car rallies--are missing the point."

In a 2013 column titled Americans Still Embrace the Spirit of '76, Scott Rasmussen, a frequent guest on Fox News and other outlets, where he usually supports Republican talking points wrote: "We believe that we have the right to make our own decisions about our own lives, so long as they don't infringe on the rights of others. We use our freedom to solve problems by working together in communities. This attitude was described by Thomas Jefferson and others as "the Spirit of '76." It continues to create problems for political elites today because 63 percent think there is more danger with a government that is too powerful than with one that is not powerful enough."

== See also ==
- Commemoration of the American Revolution
- Timeline of the American Revolution
