= Old Meeting House (Marblehead) =

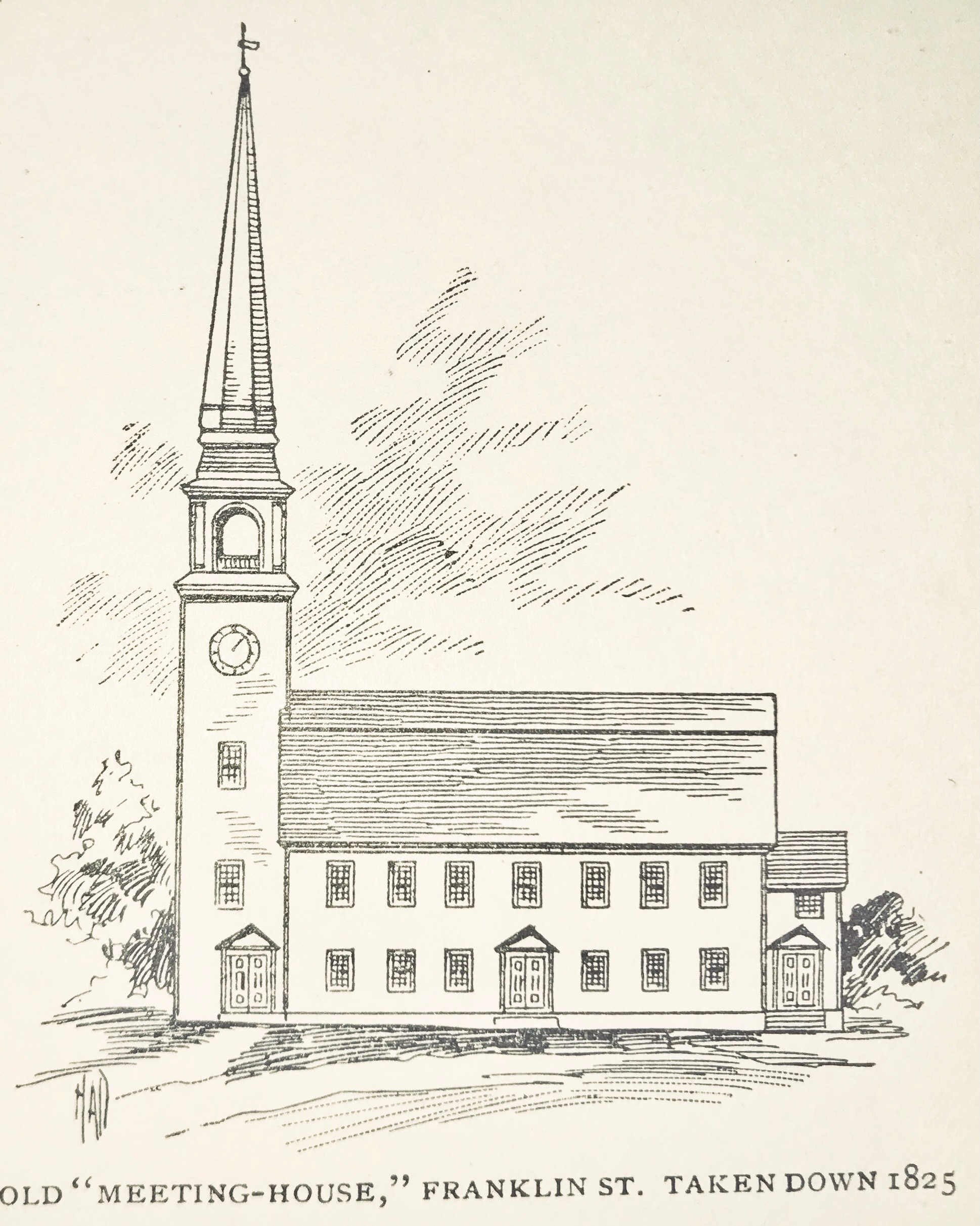
- Interactive map of the Old Meeting House area

General information
- Location: Marblehead, MA
- Coordinates: 42.50816°N 70.84632°W
- Completed: 1696
- Demolished: 1825

The Old Meeting House was constructed in Marblehead, Massachusetts in 1696 on Franklin Street. It was the second meeting house to be constructed for what would become the Congregationalist church. Portions of the meeting house pews are the largest group of joined interior paneling to survive from any seventeenth century New England Building, which still survive to this day in museums and private homes.

== Architectural design ==
=== Exterior ===
The final configuration of the meeting house tower stood at the intersection of what is now Washington and Franklin Street, containing the bell tower, town clock(voted to add in 1799 by the Town of Marblehead), and weathervane of a Golden Cod. There were three entrances, a main central entrance on Franklin Street/Washington Street intersection, one at the tower, and one at the rear porch of the building. The meetinghouse had no heat source, so there was no chimney, and was painted in a "clapboard color".

=== Interior Layout ===
The interior layout had a central aisle from the Washington street entrance leading to pulpit, surrounded by a total of 74 box pews, many reusing elements form the first meeting house. The second level gallery was on 3 sides of the meeting house, containing 20 box pews, along with bench seating.The central section of the gallery was used for singers, with men on one side, and women on the other. There was a third level gallery that was removed in 1800. The pulpit had a sounding board, above which were 13 gilt stars that were placed in 1780 representing the 13 original colonies.

=== The Pews ===
The pews from the 1638 First Meeting House were salvaged and reused for the Franklin Street Meeting House, and are thought to have been originally made in 1659, replacing the benches, by John Norman Jr . These were constructed of riven oak with applied reeded ogee moldings, and originally had spindles on top. Since the Franklin street meeting house was larger, new pews had to be made, this time out of pine and lacking the more decorative elements of the oak panels.

First Level of Meeting House

Second Level of Meeting House

Section of Old Meeting House

Reused oak panels from the First Meeting House and the new infill pine panels created for the Franklin Street Meeting House

== History ==
=== Meeting House & Church ===
The first meeting house in Marblehead was constructed on what is today Old Burial Hill in 1638. Serving the dual purpose of the town church and meeting house for town government affairs, which was typical during the time period. It was determined for unknown reasons, that a new meeting house was needed by the 1690s. It was decided at Town Meeting in September 1695 for the construction of a new meeting house. Land was purchased from the Riddan family at the intersection of the narrow lane, later Meeting House lane(now Franklin Street) and Broad Street(now Washington Street). The land had originally been the town stocks and orchard land with a natural spring along the current Franklin Street side of the lot.

As part of the agreement of transfer of the property for use of a new meetinghouse, if the congregation were to ever relocate elsewhere, the land could not be sold, but would revert to the Riddan family.

It is believed the original building was constructed in similar style to the first meeting house, remainscent to the Old Ship Church in Hingham, MA. This fact was noted in records when an addition was proposed to be built, and the drawing showed an elevation in similar style to the first meeting house. Many elements reused from it, this included pews, evident with the two distinct styles of where new ones were needed to be made. The second meeting house, which would eventually be known as the Old Meeting House by the mid-1700s, had at least two alterations over the years. This included an enlarged roof, where according to parishioners as children said: "remember seeing an old roof under the outer one with a dark space between, which they used to call the 'dungeon and of crawling into as far as they dared without risking a slide into the dark depth." The Parsons house was built diagonally across the street in 1716, and still stands today, known as the Parson Barnard House, named after one of the ministers of the church.

The meeting house was enlarged in 1724, with an addition of 20 feet long built at the south east end. The final dimensions of the meeting house were 94 feet long by 49 feet width. The meeting house served as a town meeting location when it was decided at town meeting on March 4, 1727, to build a new Town House which was completed in 1728. It would still occasionally be used for large town meetings since the new Town House didn't have adequate seating space.

1763 sketch of Marblehead showing the Old Meeting House steeple on the far right.

In 1789 the building was beginning to become in a deteriorated state, with repairs made. In 1815 a hurricane had caused the steeple to become separated by about 8 inches from the main building and was never repaired. By 1823, the meeting house was in a state of decay, and the proprietors of the meetinghouse voted on the construction of a new meeting house, determining it was unsafe for the congregation to continue to assemble there. A new location was determined for a new meeting house, with a gift from the William Reed the congregation purchased a lot of land on Washington Street. The congregation would then to move to the new church by 1824, today known as the Old North Church.

=== Mistaken Sale ===
After moving to the new church, the meeting house and land was first sold by mistake, having forgotten the agreement in the 1690s that the land would be returned to the heirs of John Riddan. The deed of sale was revoked, and the land would go to the Hawkes family, and later Mary Alley, all heirs of John Riddan.

The steeple was first demolished, and required twenty men to pull it down. The Golden Cod weather vane was sold and reinstalled at the new meeting house(Old North Church) on Washington Street supposedly along with the bell. The main portion of the building remained standing for another year, being used as a barn for hay and grain.

=== Architectural Salvage & Demolition ===
The meeting house structure was finally sold in 1825 to Captain Joshua Orne, William Hawkes, and Deacon Goodwin and mostly demolished. Elements would be salvaged, with a large portion being incorporated into the construction of the Goodwin House on corner of Washington and Stacey Street, The house at 14 Orne Street, the Hawkes house on 2 Franklin Street, along with a shoemakers cottage on Goodwins Head that incorporated many of the original pews as wall boards.

The southeast "porch"(the two story rear addition) would remain on the Hawkes property, with a later addition being made and used as a shoe workshop, and later a small business. This final element would remain on Franklin Street until 1899, when it was purchased by William B. Peach, and moved up to Orne Street at the base of current day Fountain Park, where he remodeled it as his new house.

Former location of Old Meeting House

=== Site Today ===
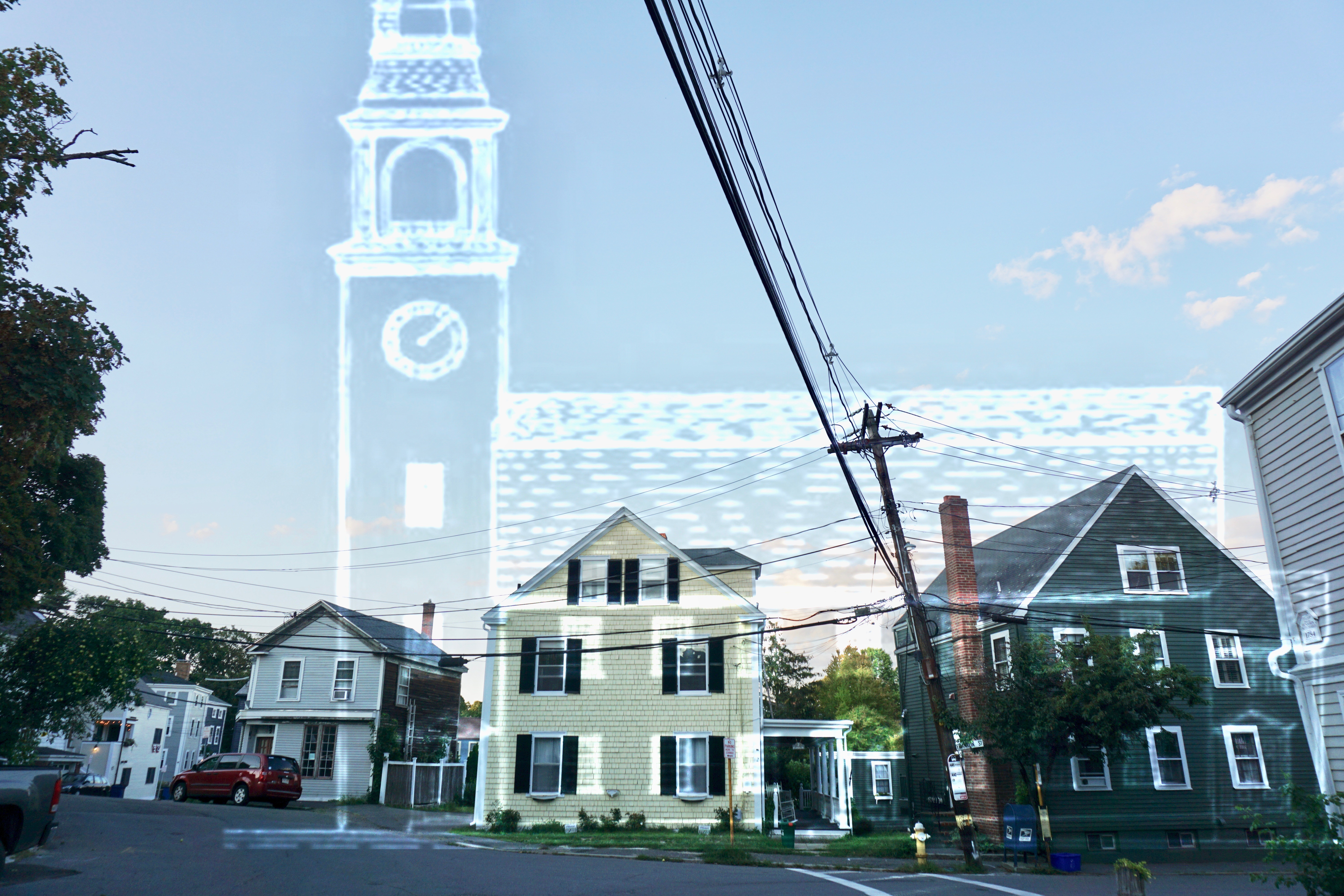
Site of the Old Meeting House today on Franklin Street with overlay elevation.

During laying of water pipes in 1878, the foundation of the old meeting house was rediscovered, and portions most likely remains under Washington and Franklin street today. Currently on the site of the former meeting house stands 2 Franklin Street(Hawkes House), which incorporated elements from the original building. This is evident in the wide floor boards that predate the typical size used in the period the house was constructed. The main central building of the former Mary Alley Hospital also stands on the rear portion of the site.

== Old Meeting House relics ==
- The Pews: represent some of the best surviving first period joinery in the colonies, pieces can be found at the Marblehead Historical Society and the Old North Church. A few private homes in town also contain some of the pews reused as wall paneling. This includes 14 Orne Street, where many of the original First Meeting House oak panels(1659) were incorporated into the third floor expansion. Panels were also featured in the Museum of Fine Arts Exhibit "New England Begins"
- The Sounding Board: discovered to have been reused in the construction of an outhouse, was saved, and returned to the Old North Church congregation.
- The Golden Cod: the weathervane still remains on top of the new meeting house the Old North Church
- The Goodwin House & The Hawkes House: Both still standing today, containing many wood and structural elements salvaged from the meeting house.
- The Rear "porch": The two story rear addition(called a "porch") of the Meeting House that was reused as shoe workshop, and rebuilt as house, still stands at 57 Orne street, having been relocated there from Franklin Street in 1899, and the last visible structure of the Old Meeting House.
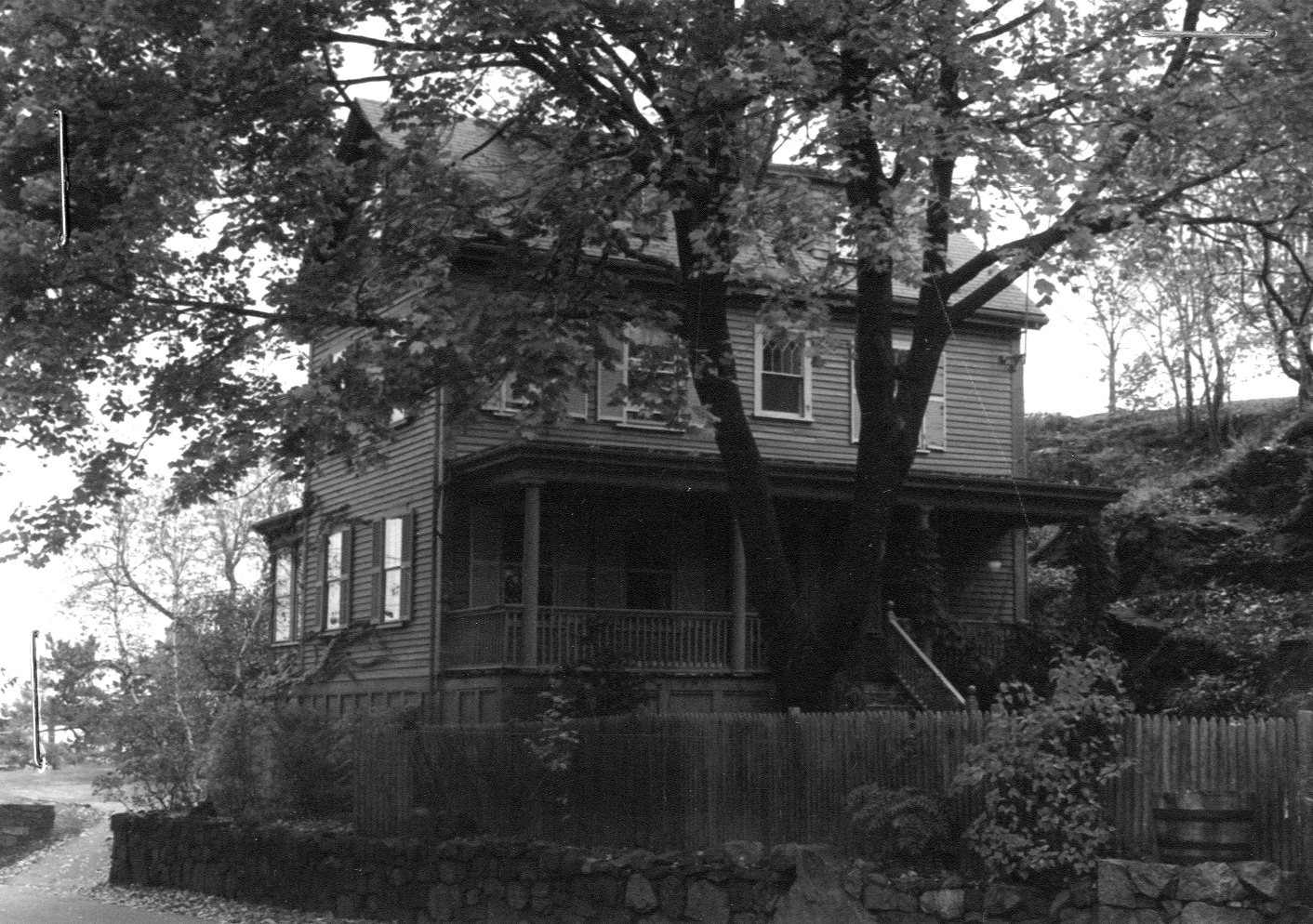
William Peach House, a portion of the last remnant of Old Meeting House, relocated to Orne Street in 1899 at the base of Fountain Park.

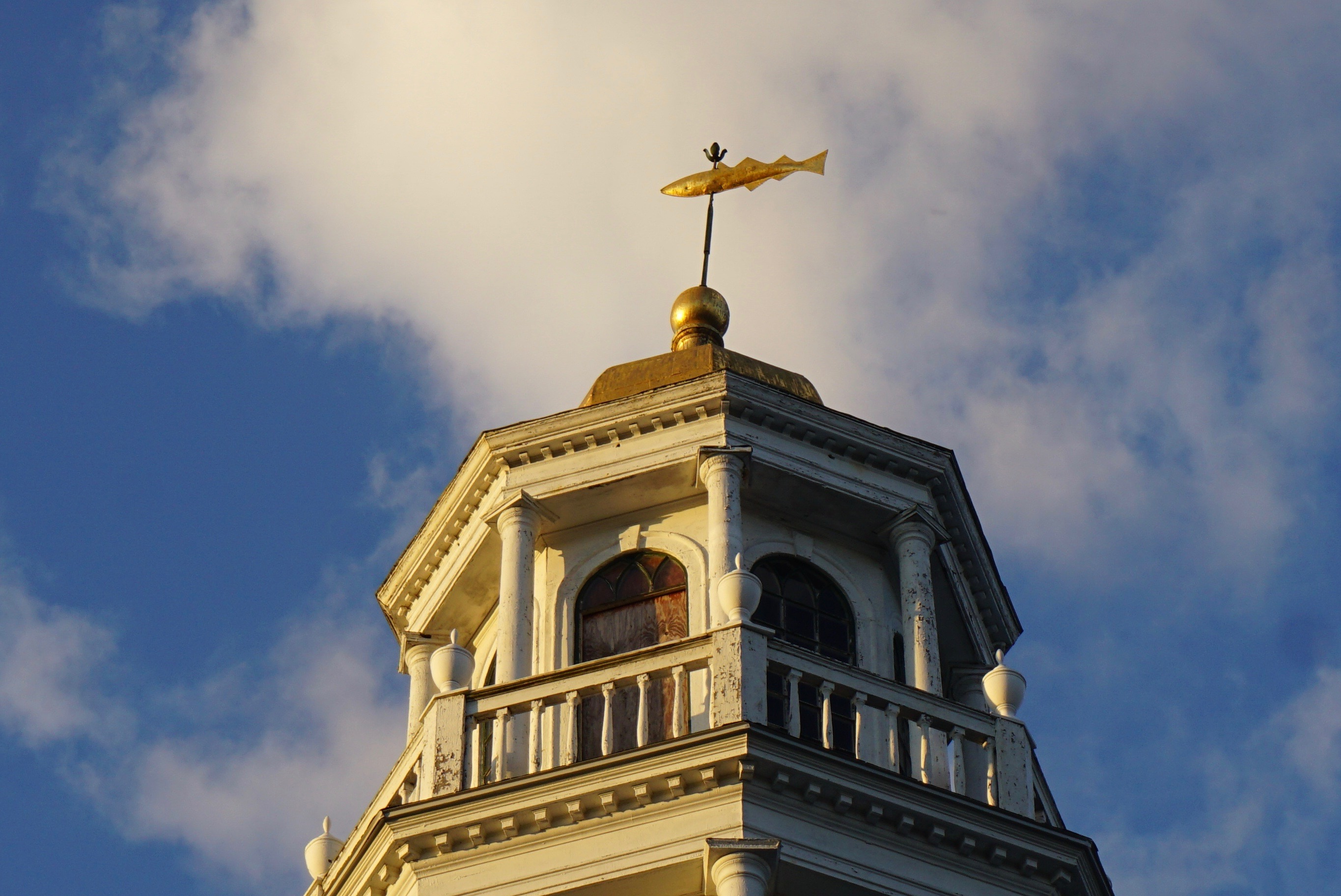
Golden Cod weathervane from the Old Meeting House now on top of Old North Church

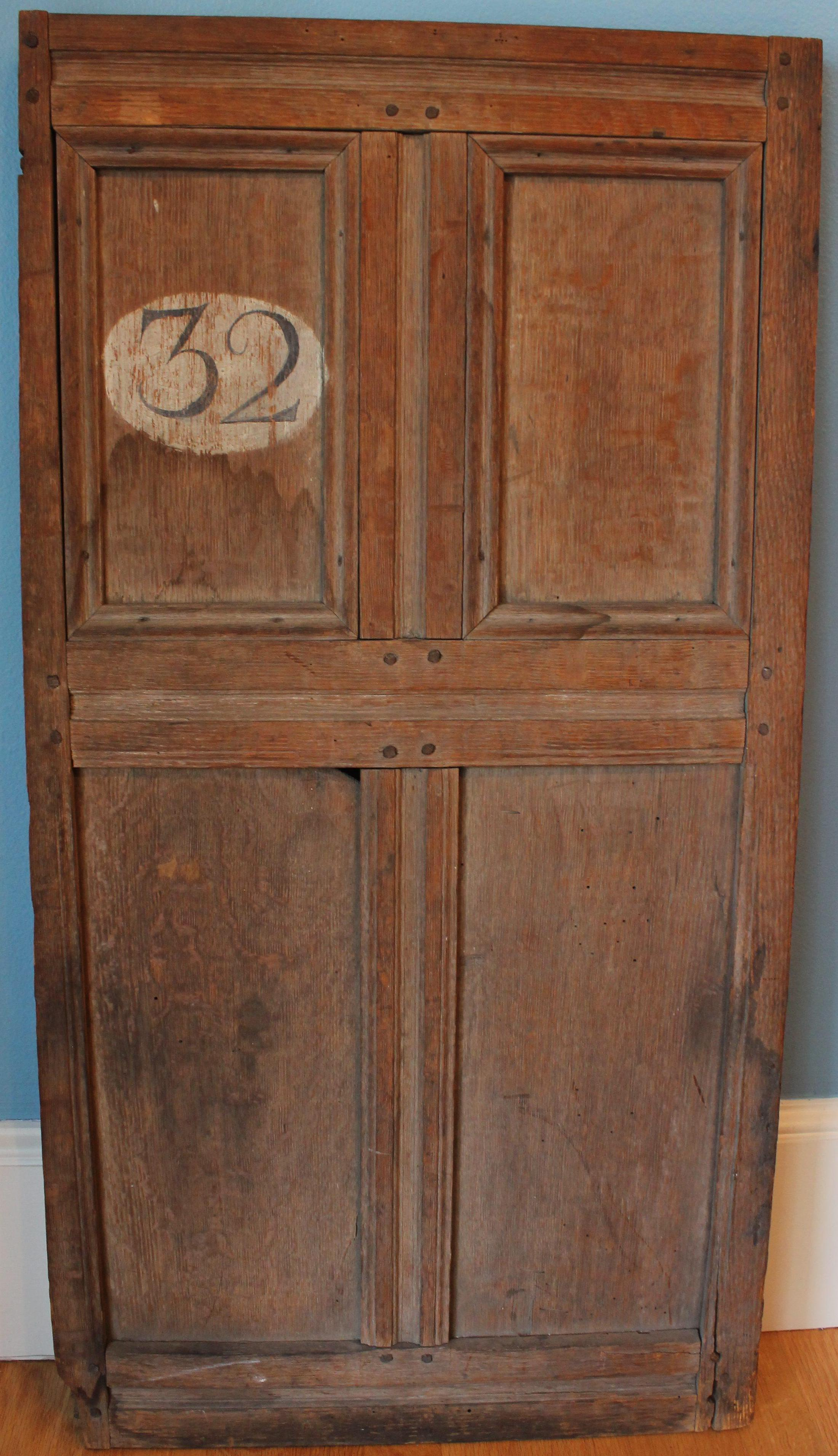
Pew panel from First Meeting House, and later incorporated into the Old Meeting House in 1696 (Marblehead Historical Society)
