= Bombay (mango) =

Mango cultivar

Mangifera 'Bombay'
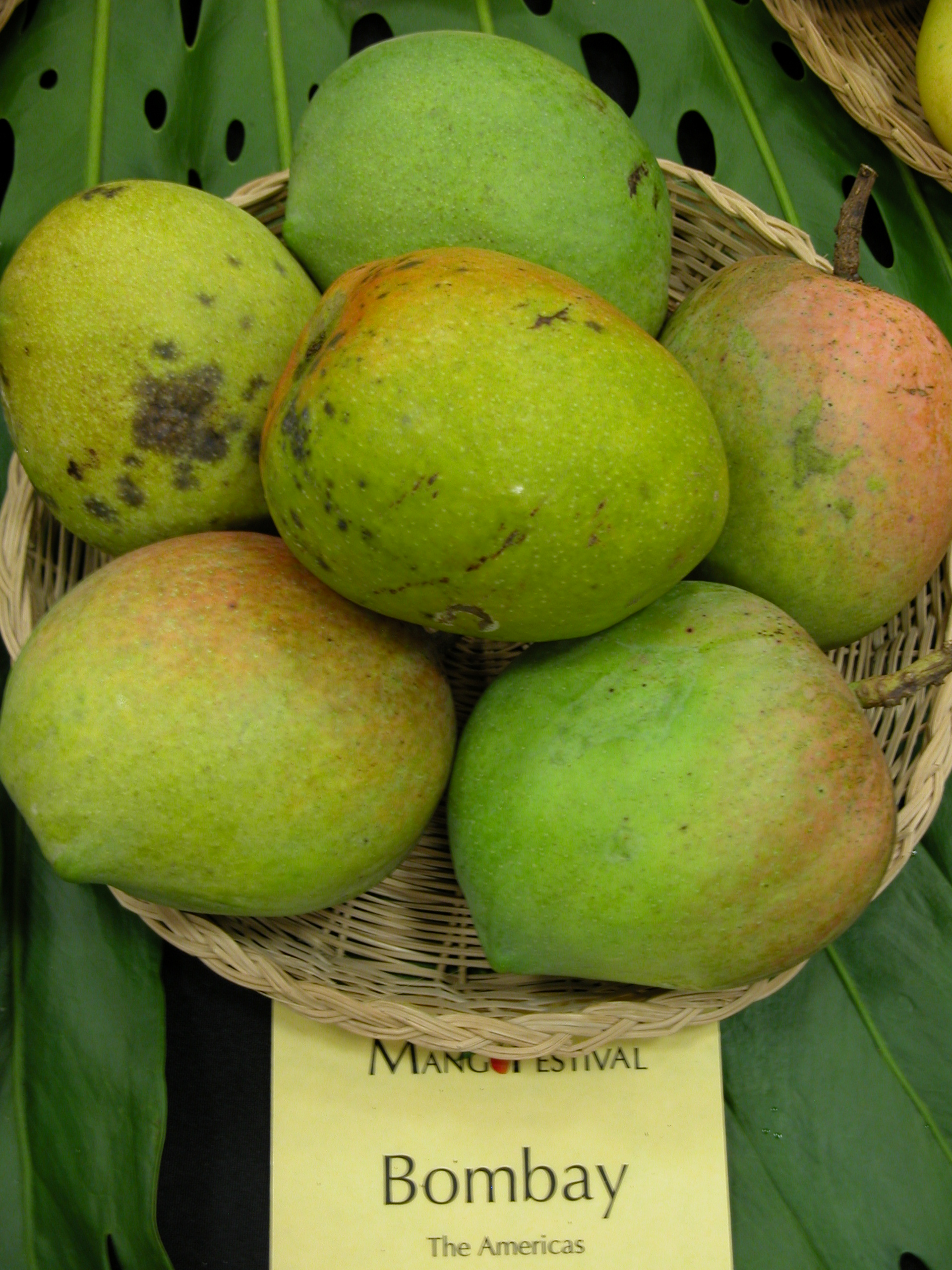
- Bombay mango at the 15th Annual International Mango Festival at the Fairchild Tropical Botanic Garden in Coral Gables, Florida
- Genus: Mangifera
- Species: Mangifera indica
- Hybrid parentage: Seed from India, parents unknown
- Cultivar: 'Bombay'
- Origin: Jamaica

The 'Bombay' mango is a named mango cultivar that originated in Jamaica.

== History ==
Bombay was originally grown from a seed brought to Jamaica from India during the Indian indenture system in the 19th century. The fruit became popular due to its widely accepted flavor, and Bombay was eventually introduced into the United States via south Florida, where it is now sold as nursery stock. A 2005 pedigree analysis of the Florida mango cultivars found that Bombay was a parent of several mangoes which originated in the state, including Bailey's Marvel, Jacquelin, and Zill. All were estimated to have been Haden × Bombay crosses.

== Description ==
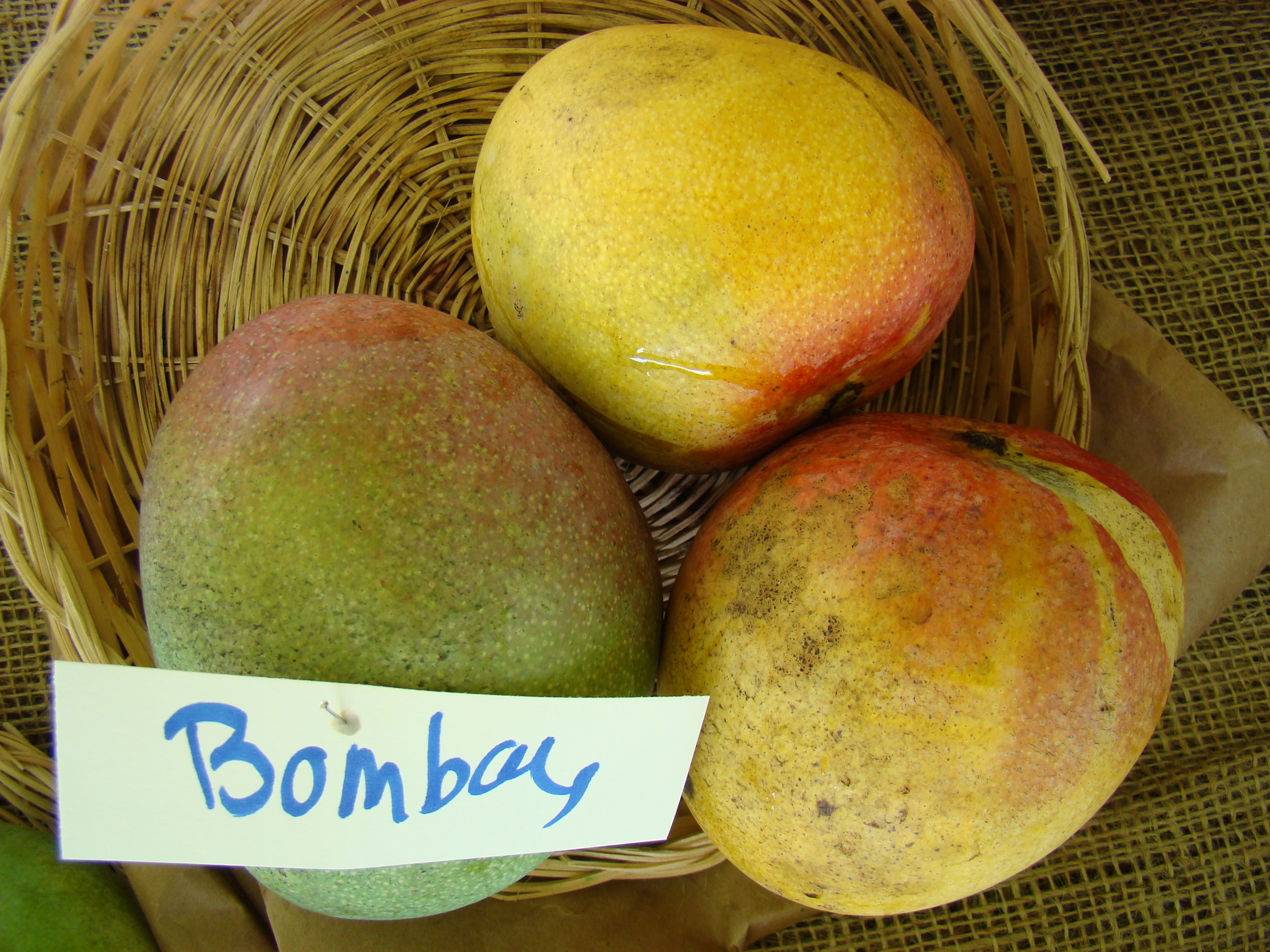
Bombay mango at the Redland Summer Fruit Festival, Fruit and Spice Park, Homestead, Florida.

The fruit averages less than a pound at maturity and typically remains mostly green, with little red blush. The flesh is dark orange and completely fiber-less. It has a flavor described as being rich and spicy. It is known for having an easily removable seed.

The trees are vigorous in growth and form open canopies.
