= Old Town House (Marblehead, Massachusetts) =

- U.S. National Register of Historic Places
- U.S. Historic district – Contributing property
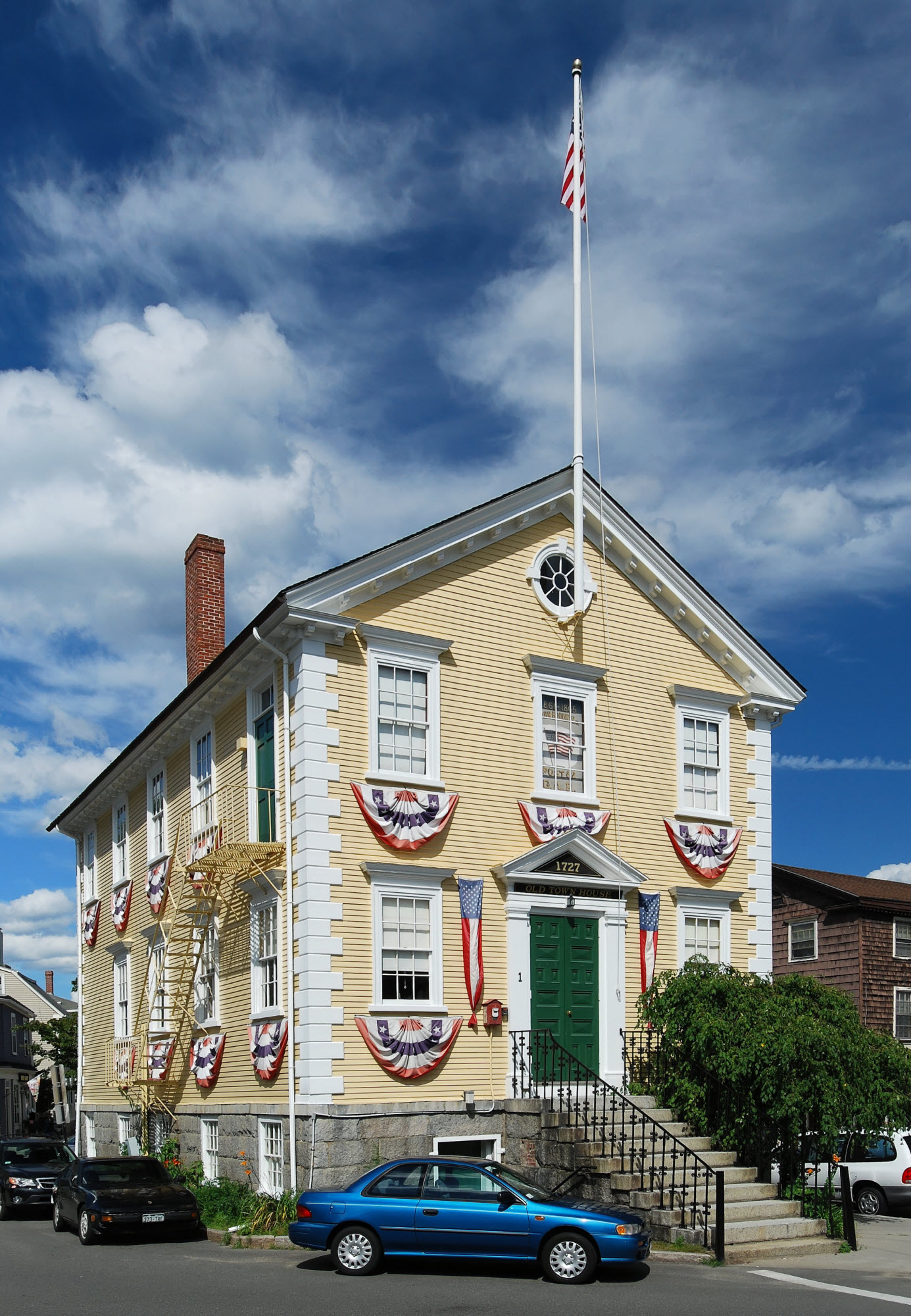

- Location within Massachusetts Location within the United States
- Location: Marblehead, Massachusetts
- Coordinates: 42°30′19″N 70°51′1″W
- Built: 1727
- Architect: Nathan Bowen
- Architectural style: Georgian
- Part of: Marblehead Historic District (ID84002402)
- NRHP reference No.: 76000265

Significant dates
- Added to NRHP: August 13, 1976
- Designated CP: January 10, 1984

The Old Town House is in the heart of the Marblehead Historic District at One Market Square in Marblehead, Massachusetts, at the intersection of Washington, State, and Mugford Streets.

The town house was constructed in 1727 and was a replacement for the Old Meeting House on Franklin Street. The upper level of the building served as a town hall, while the lower level was originally used as a market. The upstairs is still used as a town hall, but the lower level is the location of the Marblehead Police Museum. During the American Revolution notable proponents of liberty such as Elbridge Gerry and General John Glover debated independence in the building. The building would eventually be replaced as the town hall when the new Abbot Hall was built in 1876.

The building was added to the National Register of Historic Places in 1976, and included in the Marblehead Historic District in 1984.

== See also ==
- National Register of Historic Places listings in Essex County, Massachusetts
