= Bailey's Marvel =

Mango cultivar

Mangifera 'Bailey's Marvel'
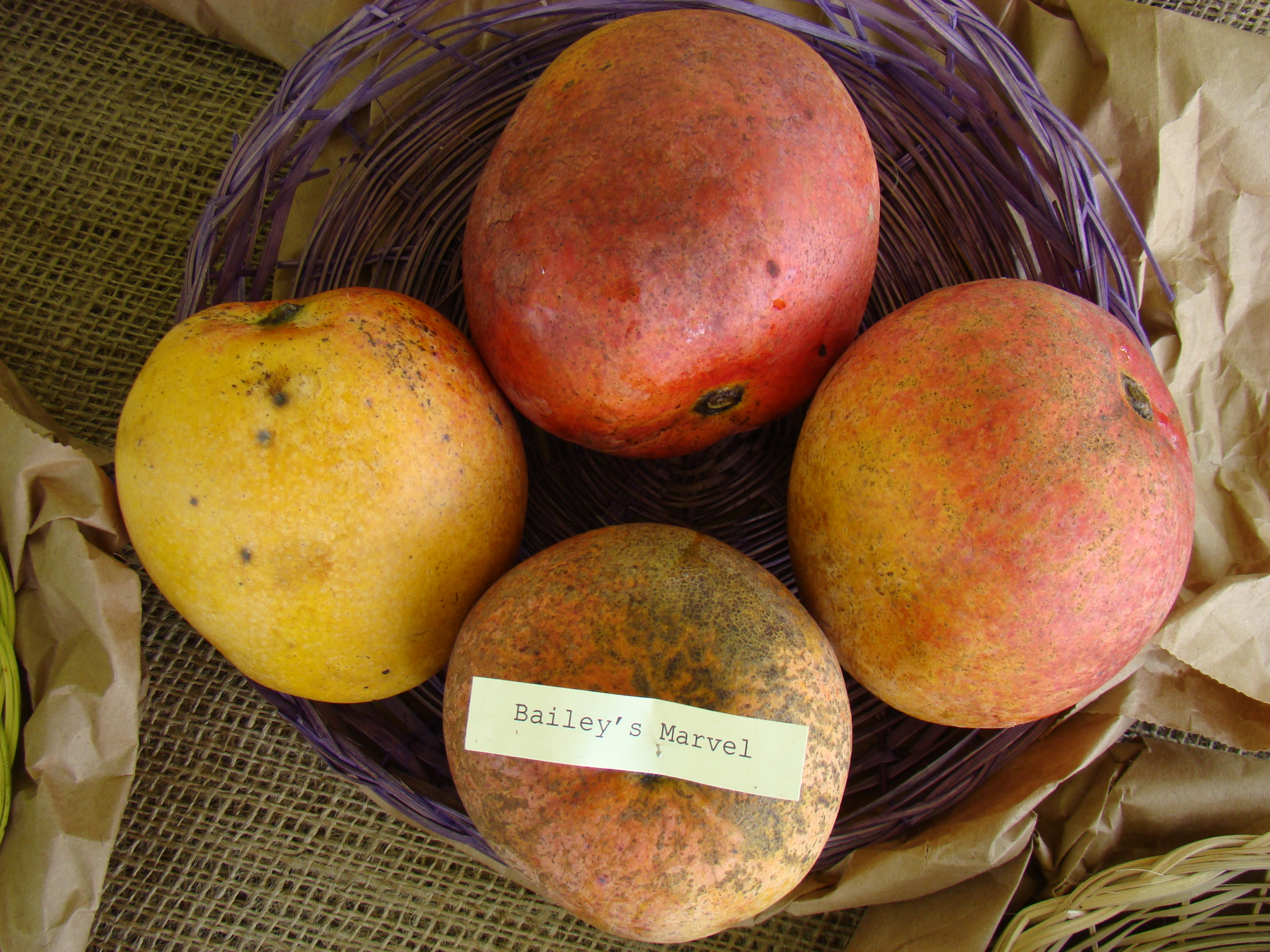
- Bailey's Marvel mangoes at the Redland Summer Fruit Festival, Fruit and Spice Park, Homestead, Florida
- Genus: Mangifera
- Species: Mangifera indica
- Hybrid parentage: 'Haden' × 'Bombay'
- Cultivar: 'Bailey's Marvel'
- Origin: Florida, US

The 'Bailey's Marvel' mango is a named, mid-season mango cultivar that originated in southwest Florida.

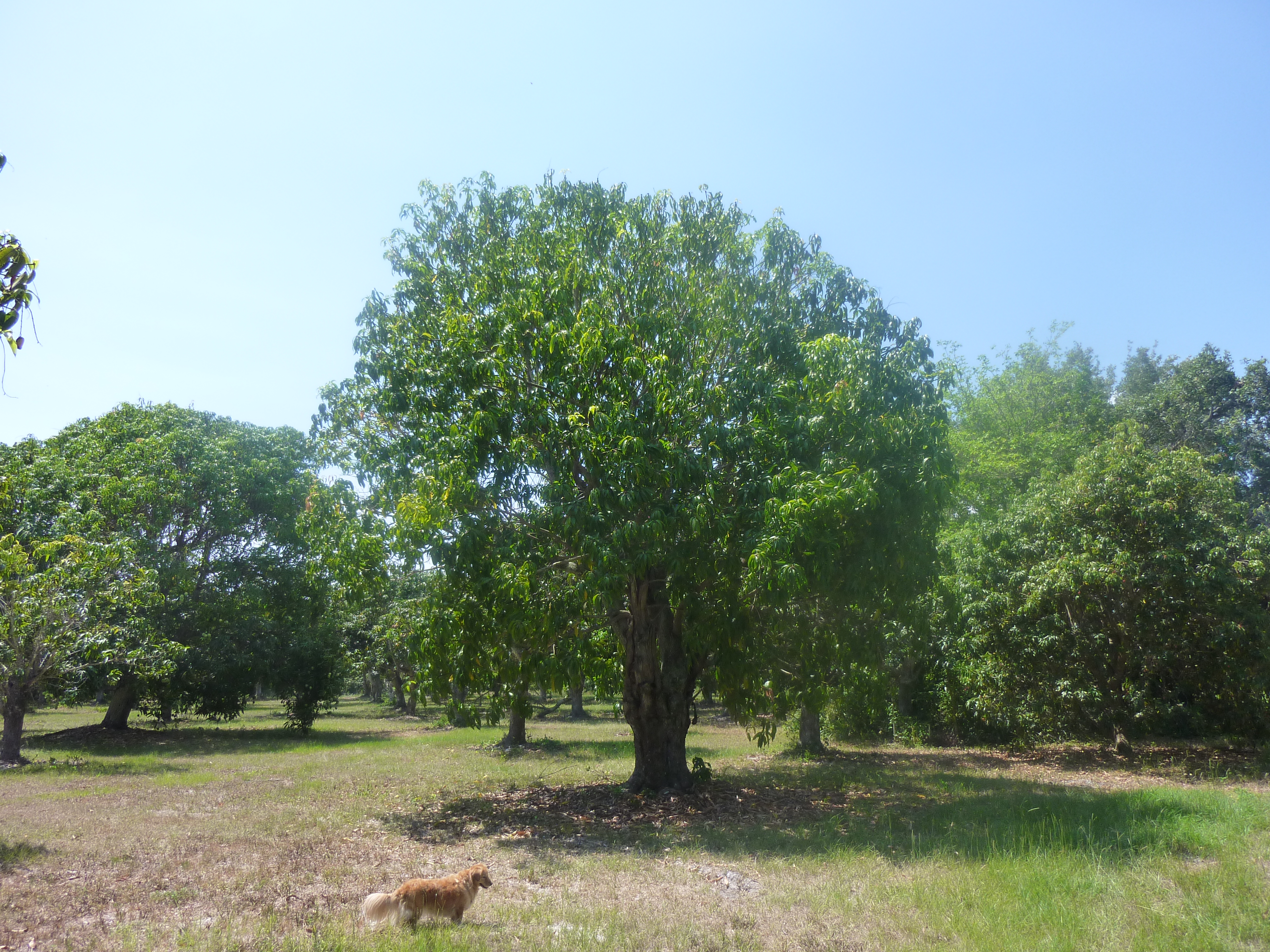
The tree believed to be the original Bailey's Marvel, located in Bokeelia, Florida.

== History ==
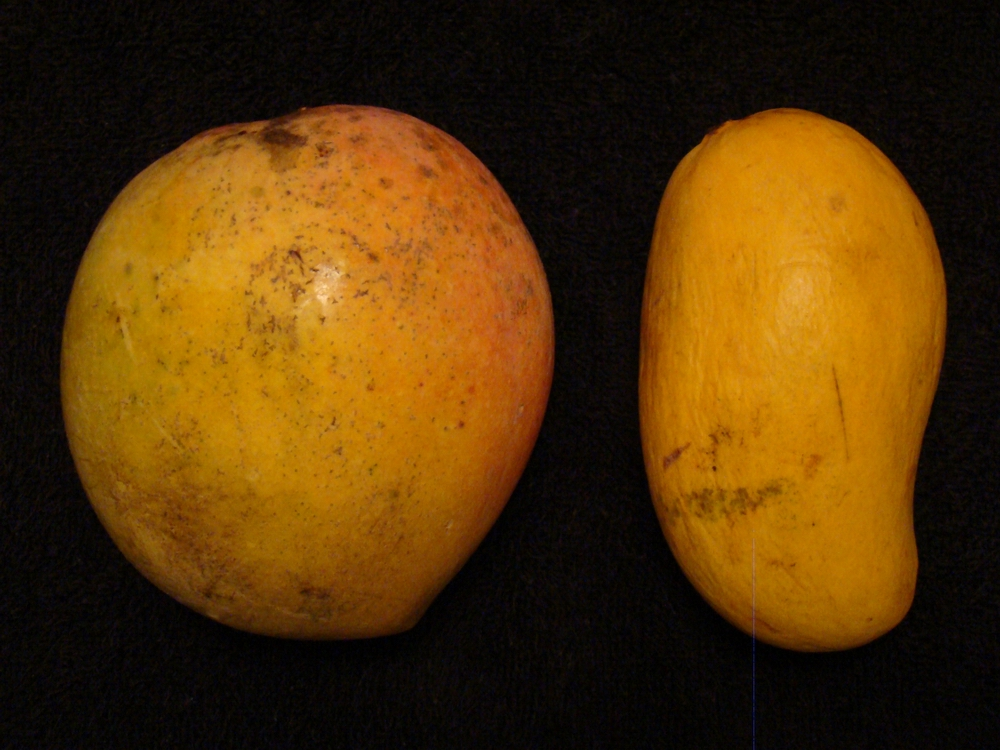
Comparison of Bailey's Marvel (left) with Ataulfo (right)

The original tree was grown on Pine Island, Florida from a 'Haden' mango seed planted in the 1940s on the property of the Bailey brothers. A 2005 pedigree analysis estimated that Bailey's Marvel was likely a cross between Haden and Bombay. The variety did not become a major commercial cultivar but did become a popular dooryard variety.

Bailey's Marvel trees are planted in the collections of the USDA's germplasm repository in Miami, Florida, the University of Florida's Tropical Research and Education Center in Homestead, Florida, and the Miami-Dade Fruit and Spice Park. The original tree is still standing on Pine Island.

== Description ==
The fruit is shaped very similar to its parent 'Haden' and has a similar flavor with fiberless flesh, averaging about a pound in weight and containing a monoembryonic seed. It ripens from July to mid-August in Florida, making it a mid-season cultivar there.

The trees are moderately vigorous growers and have a reputation for being slightly more cold tolerant than other varieties.
