= Dot (mango) =

Mango cultivar

Mangifera 'Dot'
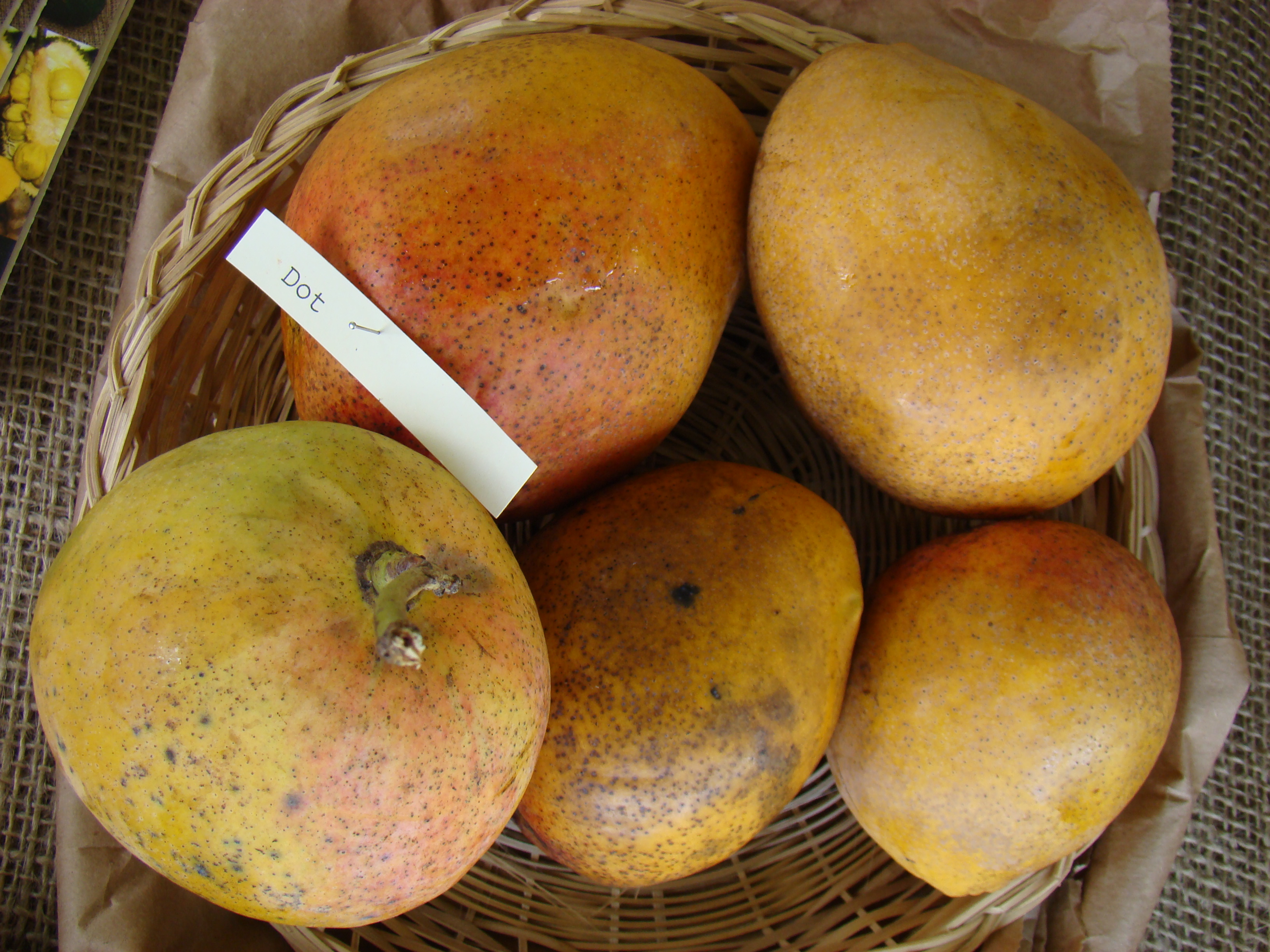
- Dot mangoes
- Genus: Mangifera
- Hybrid parentage: 'Zill' × unknown
- Cultivar: 'Dot'
- Breeder: Laurence Zill
- Origin: Florida, USA

The 'Dot' mango is a mango cultivar that originated in South Florida. The cultivar has limited to no commercial plantings but is sold as nursery stock for home use in Florida.

== History ==
Dot was originally developed by nurseryman Laurence Zill of Boynton Beach, Florida, and was named after his wife Dorothy. It was reportedly a seedling of the Carrie mango, however a 2005 pedigree analysis by the USDA estimated it was a seedling of the Zill mango. Dot was propagated for several years by the Zill nursery but fell out of favor due to disease susceptibility and lack of ideal color. However, Frank Smathers of Miami, Florida received several cuttings of the Dot and took up propagating the tree, finding the eating quality of the fruit to be very high. The fruit began to be promoted as a popular dooryard cultivar beginning in 1992 at the Fairchild Tropical Garden International Mango Festival, where it has become a featured cultivar several years.

Today, Dot is still sold as a dooryard tree in Florida. Dot trees are also planted in the collections of the USDA's germplasm repository in Miami, Florida, the University of Florida's Tropical Research and Education Center in Homestead, Florida, and the Miami-Dade Fruit and Spice Park, also in Homestead.

== Description ==
The fruit is oval to ovate in shape, with a pointed apex that has minimal to no beak. The fruit average slightly less than a pound at maturity, developing yellow skin often containing pinkish blush. The flesh is fiberless, juicy, aromatic and firm, with a flavor described as very rich and sweet. It contains a monoembryonic seed. The fruit matures from June to August in Florida, giving it an extended season. The fruit and flowers are susceptible to anthracnose fungus, which can limit production.

The trees are moderately vigorous growers that develop open canopies. The leaves are noted for often having a yellow appearance despite the trees being healthy.

== See also ==
- List of mango cultivars
