= J. O. J. Frost =

American painter

John Orne Johnson Frost (January 2, 1852 – November 3, 1928), who signed his work as J. O. J. Frost, was an early 20th-century American folk artist. He began painting at the age of 70, without receiving any formal training. Frost considered himself a historian, not an artist, and his paintings portrayed daily life in the fishing village of Marblehead, Massachusetts, during the mid-19th century, as well as the town's colonial history.

Frost's works are in the collections of the Marblehead Museum in Marblehead, Massachusetts, the Fenimore Art Museum in Cooperstown, New York, the Shelburne Museum in Shelburne, Vermont and the Smithsonian American Art Museum in Washington, D.C.

== Early life ==
Born in Marblehead on January 2, 1852, Frost lived his early life in a house on Front Street next to Marblehead Harbor. Frost grew up listening to the stories of the local fishermen about the history of Marblehead, and these stories would serve as a major source of inspiration in Frost's later work.

At the age of sixteen, Frost went to sea, first on the fishing vessel Josephine in 1868 and then on the Oceania in 1869. The Oceania was nearly lost in a snow storm, and after this experience Frost would never go to sea again. As an old man, J.O.J. wrote down his memories of those experiences. Along with other archival materials, his memoir became the basis for a historical novel, Molly Waldo: A Young Man’s First Voyage to the Grand Banks of Newfoundland, Adapted from the Stories of Marblehead Fishermen of the 1800s.

Frost married Amy Ann ("Annie") Lillibridge in 1873. They remained married until her death. Frost worked a variety of odd jobs, first as a carpenter's apprentice to his strict uncle. Next, he cooked at his father-in-law's restaurant “Lillibridge's,” before opening his own restaurant. On Christmas night of 1888, the Second Great Fire of Marblehead destroyed 50 buildings; one of them was Frost's eatery. Annie's brother invited him to be partners, so once again Frost manned the stove at the Lillibridge restaurant, until 1893.

J.O.J. left the cookstove to help with his wife's business of growing and selling cut flowers. Annie Frost had become known as a gardening authority and her "Old Fashioned Garden" was featured as an illustrated booklet, published in 1902. Her specialty was sweet peas, a very popular flower at the turn of the century. Planted in rows, with distinct colors and names, the fragrant varieties bore delightful names, such as Blanche Burpee, Othello, Royal Rose, Lovely, and Apple Blossom. Her entrepreneurial talents were the subject of an article in McCall's magazine in 1911.

When Annie Frost died in 1919, J.O.J. sought new ways to share his passion for history. He wrote newspaper articles for The Marblehead Messenger that told younger generations about the old days. Not long after Annie's death, he found a new outlet for his storytelling; Frost sought to capture his memories of an earlier Marblehead through painting.

== Work ==
In 1922, Frost began creating paintings on wallboard using house paint and other available materials. Drawing on his memories and stories he had heard, he depicted Marblehead as a fishing town during the 1860s and 1870s. Frost had no formal artistic training, and his paintings often included descriptive captions reflecting his interest in documenting local history. He also made ship models and wood carvings depicting fish and birds found along the New England coast during his youth. By the end of his life, he had completed approximately 130 paintings and 40 woodcarvings.

Frost attempted to promote his work locally, transporting his paintings around town in a wheelbarrow and establishing a small museum behind his home. By 1925, the museum displayed his work and attracted some tourists, although local interest was limited. There are no recorded sales of his work during his lifetime.

== Legacy ==
Frost died November 3, 1928. His son, Frank Frost, inherited the paintings and gave 70 of them to the Marblehead Historical Society (MHS). (The Marblehead Historical Society is now the Marblehead Museum.) Frank hoped that a museum could be built to house his father's paintings and serve as a memorial to Marblehead's fishermen. The Great Depression put an end to that dream. With no room to display the art, the MHS stored most of the paintings in the attic of the Jeremiah Lee Mansion, the only property owned by the Society. Members provided storage space for the overflow. The paintings were out of public view until 1940, when the first exhibit of Frost paintings took place at the Marblehead Arts Association. The Arts Association President, Arthur William Heintzelman (a highly regarded etcher and lithographer) organized the show with pictures on loan from the MHS. Soon thereafter, the MHS displayed some of their paintings in a third floor bedroom of the Lee Mansion, where they were included in visitor tours.

In 1943, Mr. and Mrs. Albert Carpenter, folk art collectors from Boston, encountered Frost's paintings while touring the Lee Mansion. They became interested in his work and, upon meeting Frank Frost, they began to acquire J.O.J.’s art from him. In 1948, Betty Carpenter helped arrange an exhibition of Frost's work at the Institute of Contemporary Art of Boston. The exhibition was well received, establishing Frost as a significant 20th century painter. Betty Carpenter worked hard to publish a book about J.O.J. and his art; although her book was never published, her working files (as well as scrapbooks, photographs, and letters once owned by J.O.J. Frost) are now housed at the Smithsonian Archives of American Art in Washington, D.C.

In the early 1950s the Frost homestead was sold. The new owners, Frederick "Dyke" Mason, Jr., and his wife Mary, were renovating the old house, when they discovered fragments of about 30 paintings mounted facing inward to the studs. Charles Childs of Childs Gallery in Boston took on the task of reconstructing and restoring the paintings. At the time, the works of untrained, "primitive" painters were being recognized and sought out by collectors. Mr. Childs agreed to exhibit 28 paintings at his Newbury Street gallery in May 1954, to be followed by a similar show at the Knoedler Galleries in New York City. Both galleries catered to the prominent folk art collectors of the day. J.O.J. Frost's wallboard art attracted the attention of an eminent folk art scholar, Nina Fletcher Little. Mrs. Little was an adviser to museums regarding their folk art holdings. She encouraged numerous collectors to buy specific Frost works and bought several for her own collection. Most of the paintings were sold before they went to New York. The Childs and Knoedler exhibitions generated a great deal of press coverage and resulted in important critical commentary about the paintings of John Orne Johnson Frost.,

The Mason's discovery led to a court case, contesting the ownership of the paintings. The Carpenters filed suit in the name of Frank Frost's estate, believing they had acquired the paintings from Frank's widow. The trial triggered numerous newspaper headlines, such as “Art, Real Estate Pose Odd Problem of Law,” and "Saved Jam But Passed Up Grandpa’s $17,000 Art". Albert Carpenter had a heart attack while testifying, resulting in a delay in the case. The judge eventually ruled in favor of the Masons, declaring the paintings an integral part of the real estate they had purchased.

One of the paintings sold by Childs found its way back home. On Christmas Day of 1997, The Marblehead Reporter announced a very special gift to the town from an anonymous Marblehead family. The Board of Selectmen was presented with The Sale of Marblehead by the Indians to the White Settlers, a wallboard painting with which J.O.J. had been photographed while he was still alive. Now titled The Purchase of Marblehead (and sometimes referred to as The Deed Painting), this Frost work was donated with the stipulation that it always hang in the room where the deed is housed. Currently hanging in the Selectman's Room of Abbot Hall, near the iconic The Spirit of ’76 by Archibald M. Willard, Frost's painting is a lasting tribute to the artist's drive to record the earliest history of his beloved town.

Until 1998, the paintings owned by the MHS continued to be displayed upstairs at the Jeremiah Lee Mansion. To celebrate its Centennial year, the MHS purchased 170 Washington Street and created the J.O.J. Frost Folk Art Gallery. The second floor was transformed into a colorful exhibition and meeting space; the walls were hung with Frost's pictures. Unlike the unheated Lee Mansion, the cozy quarters provided year-round space for the archives, offices, temporary exhibitions, and school programs. This space was completely renovated and renamed in May 2017 as the J.O.J. Frost Gallery and Carolyn Lynch Education Center. When the new space opened in May 2017, a show of loaned paintings added to the celebration. Entitled More Frosts, this complementary exhibit reunited about 20 images that had been scattered during the decades since the artist's death. Also, an illustrated brochure was published that told, for the first time, the story of what happened to the J.O.J.’s paintings during the decades since he created them.

== Collections ==
The Marblehead Museum holds the largest and most comprehensive collection of J. O. J. Frost's works. A catalog of the collection was published by the museum in 2003. and the collection can be searched on-line.

The Carpenters owned a large collection of Frost's works until 1971, when their collection was sold at auction by Parke-Bernet Galleries (now Sotheby's).

Another important collection of Frost paintings was that of Nina Fletcher Little and her husband, Bertram K. Little, auctioned in 1994 by Sotheby's.

Frost paintings are currently in the collections of numerous institutions including Colonial Williamsburg (Abby Aldrich Rockefeller Folk Art Museum), the Fenimore Art Museum, Historic New England (Phillips House in Salem, Massachusetts), Marblehead Museum, Mount Holyoke College Art Museum, Museum of Fine Arts–Boston, Peabody Essex Museum, Shelburne Museum, Smith College Museum of Art, the Smithsonian American Art Museum, and Town of Marblehead (Abbot Hall, Selectman's Room). Many of these works are in storage and may be viewed only by special appointment.

The most important sources for primary materials related to John Orne Johnson Frost are the archives of the Marblehead Museum (Marblehead, Massachusetts), Betty Carpenter Papers, 1919–1953 (Archives of American Art, Smithsonian Institution in Washington, D.C.), the Nina Fletcher Little Files at Historic New England Library and Archives (Boston, Massachusetts), and the Phillips Library of the Peabody Essex Museum (Salem, Massachusetts).

In 1971, Martha Katz (now Martha Katz-Hyman) conducted research on John Orne Johnson Frost for her thesis to fulfill the requirements for her Master of Arts. In addition to a brief biography of Frost, the thesis includes two appendices and a bibliography. One appendix provides the location and short descriptions of the Frost paintings that she was able to locate and identify in 1971. The bibliography provides primary and secondary sources, along with a list of people Katz interviewed in 1971.

Project J.O.J. Frost is an independent research project that is working to locate and capture images of Frost's paintings. Researchers Bethe and Priscilla Moulton have created a website where those who know the whereabouts of Frost paintings can share this information confidentially and contribute to the master list being developed for future research purposes. In 2019, this project produced the first comprehensive treatment of this artist. The Paintings of J.O.J. Frost: An American Story by Bethe Lee Moulton includes 140 illustrations, many of which are Frost paintings that are rarely available for public viewing.
