= Triptych (philately) =

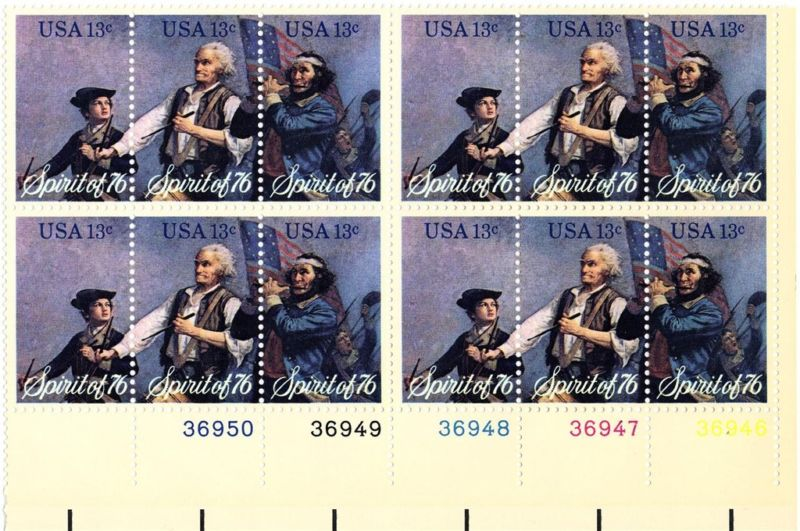
A plate block of 12 stamps showing four sets of the 1976 "Spirit of '76" triptych postage stamps.

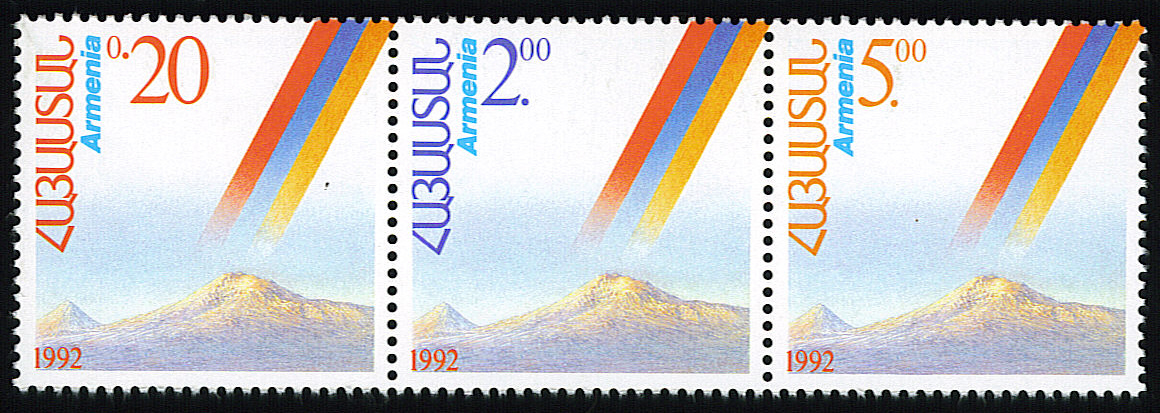
The first stamps issued by the new Republic of Armenia in 1992 were se-tenant in nature, but would not normally be denoted as a "triptych" because the three stamps, although different and thematically related, do not make a complete single design.

A triptych is a philatelic term (from the Greek: "three" + "fold") which was borrowed from the art world and having the same meaning: a set of three panels hinged together. It is used to describe three se-tenant postage stamps of related design that make up a complete single design.

In the US, the form is rarely used, perhaps because it does not lend itself to the popular plate block of four format for collecting. Instead, one frequently sees blocks of two or four or other even number of se-tenant stamps. In 1976, the US produced the "Spirit of '76" issue. In 1992 for the 500th anniversary of the discovery of America by Columbus, the US issued a series of five triptychs in vertical format based on the famous 1892 series of commemorative stamps. This was a triptych only in the sense that they were thematically related to each other, but they were distinctively three designs rather than like the continuous design of the Spirit of '76.
