= Sophie Fry =

Mango cultivar

Mangifera 'Sophie Fry'
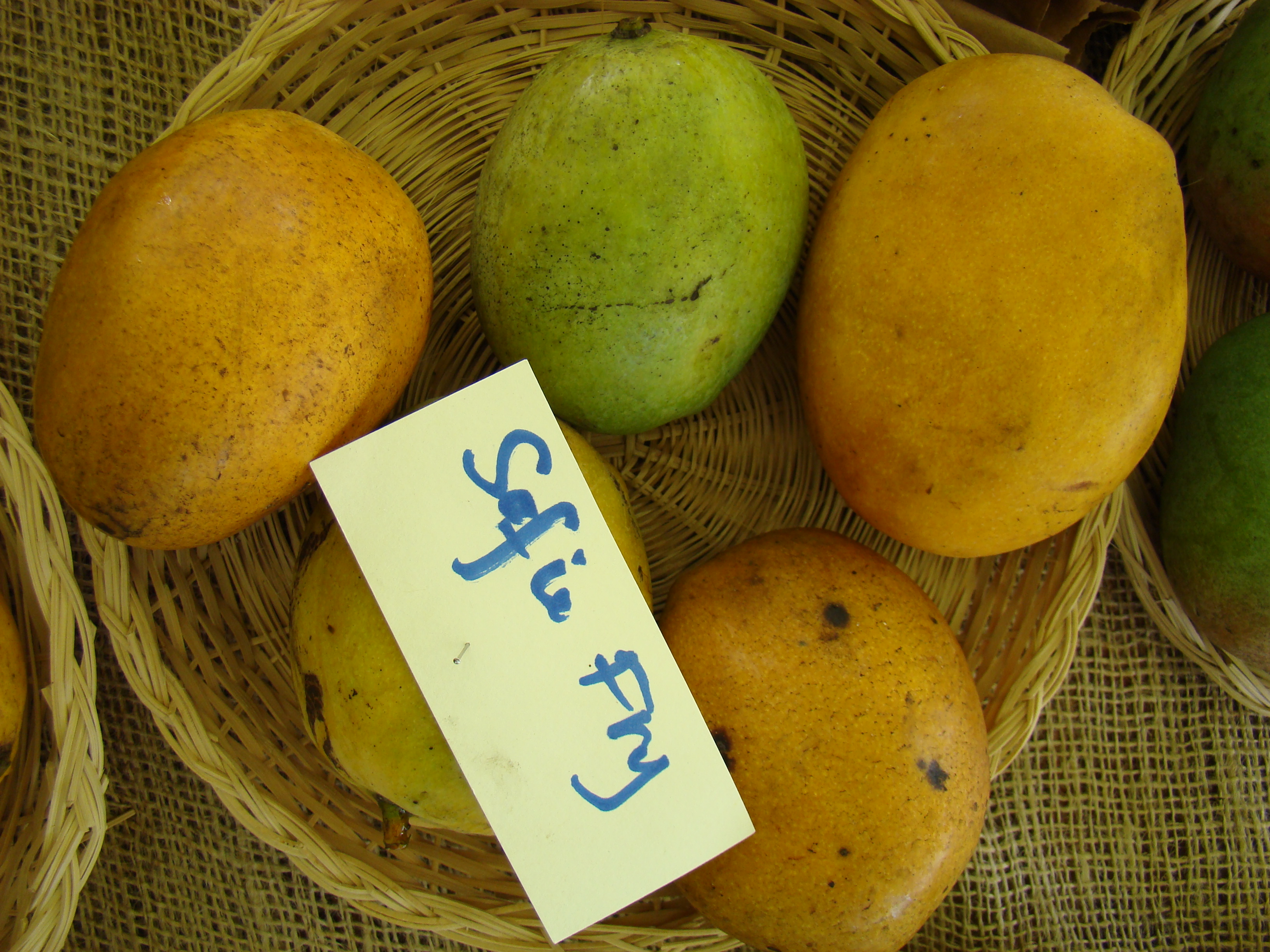
- Display of 'Sophie Fry' mangoes at the Redland Summer Fruit Festival, Fruit and Spice Park, Homestead, Florida
- Genus: Mangifera
- Species: Mangifera indica
- Hybrid parentage: 'Julie' x unknown
- Cultivar: 'Sophie Fry'
- Breeder: Laurence H. Zill
- Origin: Florida, US

The 'Sophie Fry' mango is a named mango cultivar that originated in south Florida.

== History ==
Sophie Fry was likely a seedling of the 'Julie' mango grown by Laurence Zill of Boynton Beach, Florida.

Sophie Fry is perhaps best known for reportedly being the parent of the 'Carrie' mango, which became one of the more popular dooryard cultivars sold in Florida. A 2005 pedigree analysis disputed this, estimating 'Julie' was the likely parent of Carrie; however the analysis did not include Sophie Fry in the study, which could explain the discrepancy.

The cultivar did not become a popular dooryard variety nor gain commercial acceptance. A Sophie Fry tree is planted in the collection of the University of Florida's Tropical Research and Education Center in Homestead, Florida.

== Description ==
The fruit is oval in shape, with a rounded base and rounded apex, and averages around 8 ounces in weight at maturity. The skin is green to yellow in color. The nearly fiberless flesh is orange in color, juicy, and aromatic, with a rich, sweet flavor. It contains a monoembryonic seed. Fruit production is considered to be good.

== See also ==
List of mango cultivars
