= Se-tenant =

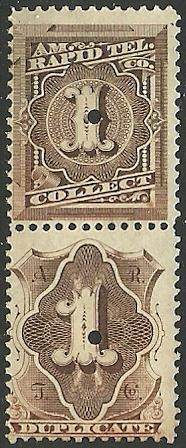
Se-tenant COLLECT and DUPLICATE stamps of the American Rapid Telegraph Company, 1881

Se-tenant stamps or labels are printed from the same plate and sheet and adjoin one another, unsevered in a strip or block. They differ from each other by design, color, denomination or overprint. They may have a continuous design. The word "se-tenant" translates from French as meaning "joined together" or "holding together".

There are differing ways of preparing a se-tenant sheet. One can have stamps of one design on half of the sheet and the second design on the other half. In this case, the only se-tenants would be in the center where the two halves meet. A more frequent set-up is to have pairs of differing stamps throughout the sheet. Sometimes when two different designs appear on a single pane, the stamps are arranged like a checkerboard, with the different designs alternating in each row and column horizontally and vertically. One can have a triptych, or a tête-bêche format (head to toe). Stamp booklets often contain se-tenant stamps or labels.

== United States stamps ==
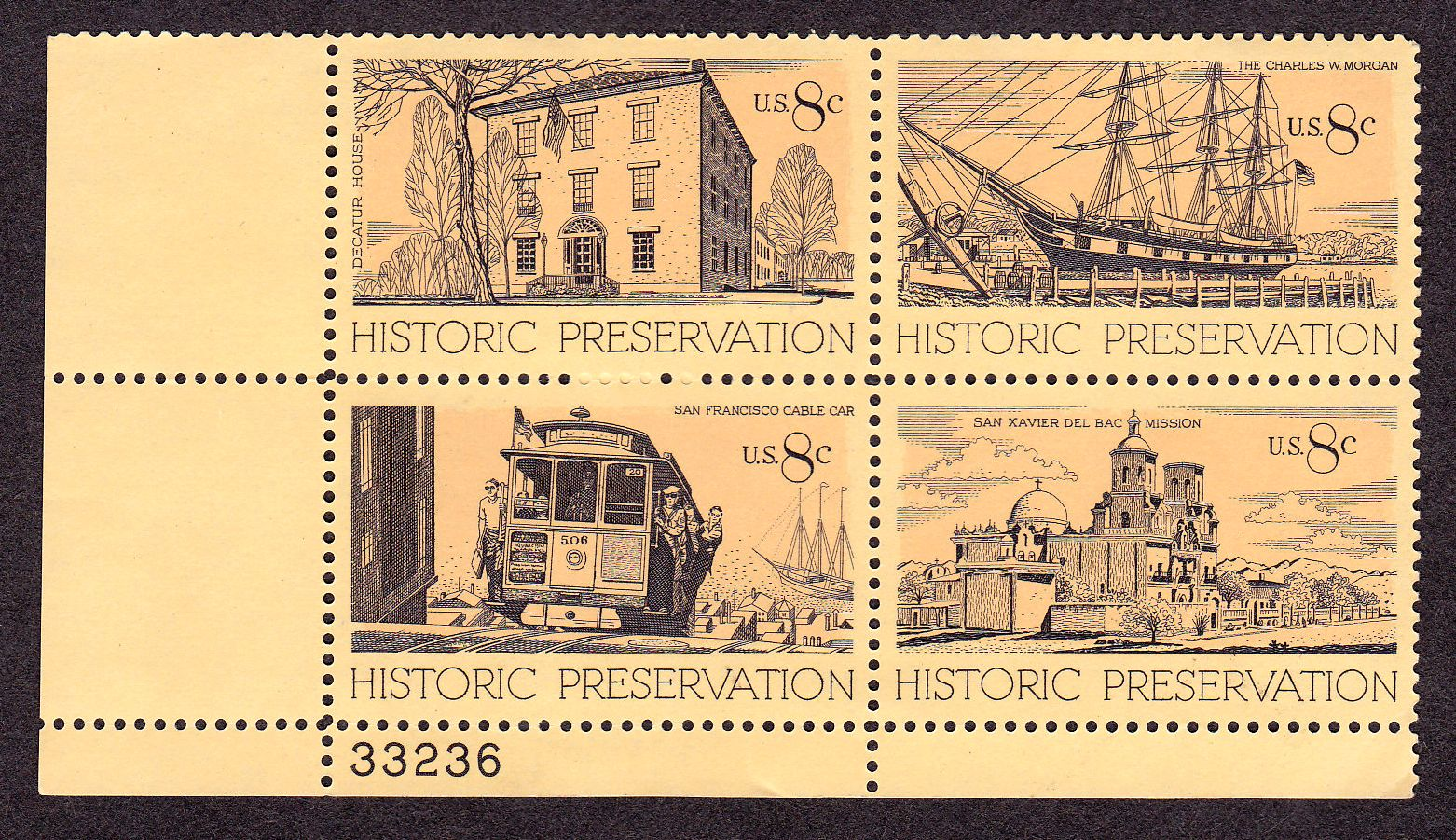
1971 Historic Preservation postage stamps in a block of four se-tenant stamps

Four of the U. S. Postmasters' Provisional stamp issues distributed between 1845 and 1847 were se-tenant productions: the Baltimore Postmaster's provisionals (two different images [5¢ and 10¢] on a sheet of twelve), the St. Louis Bears (three different images [5¢, 10¢ and 20¢] on a sheet of six), the Providence R. I. provisionals (two different images [5¢ and 10¢] on a sheet of twelve) and the Alexandria Postmaster's Provisionals (a pair of not-quite-identical 5¢ images). With the issuance of U. S. national postage stamps, which began in 1847, se-tenant production disappeared from the nation for 117 years, not introduced until the 1964 Christmas Issue, which presented images of holly, mistletoe, poinsettia and a conifer sprig in a block of four stamps. After 1967, the U. S. began offering se-tenant issues with some frequency.

The US has since printed as many as 50 different stamps on a single sheet, such as in the 50 state flags, birds and flowers. Se-tenant stamps began as issues of separate designs that were simply attached to one another, but have developed to issues where the stamps are part of a larger continuous design.
