= Spirit of '76 (mango) =

Mango cultivar

Mangifera 'Spirit of '76'
- Genus: Mangifera
- Species: Mangifera indica
- Hybrid parentage: 'Haden' × 'Zill'
- Cultivar: 'Spirit of '76'
- Breeder: Laurence H. Zill
- Origin: Florida, US

The 'Spirit of '76' mango is a named mango cultivar that originated in south Florida.

== History ==
The original tree was grown on the property of Laurence Zill of Boynton Beach, Florida and was reportedly a seedling of the Zill cultivar that had been open cross pollinated with Haden. It received its name for having first fruited during the US bicentennial celebrations. A 2005 pedigree analysis estimated that Spirit of '76 was indeed a Haden × Zill cross.

Though Spirit of '76 did not gain commercial acceptance due to its soft flesh, it has been propagated as nursery stock and sold on a limited basis as a dooryard tree for home growers in Florida.

Spirit of '76 trees are planted in the collections of the USDA's germplasm repository in Miami, Florida, and the Miami-Dade Fruit and Spice Park in Homestead, Florida.

== Description ==
The fruit is oblong in shape, with a rounded base and rounded apex that sometimes has a small lateral beak. It averages about a pound in weight at maturity. The skin color is yellow with red blush, and the flesh is yellow in color. It is completely fiberless with a rich, aromatic flavor, and contains a monoembryonic seed. The fruit ripen from June to July in Florida.

The trees are moderately vigorous growers with spreading canopies.

== See also ==
- List of mango cultivars
