= Old North Church (Marblehead) =

Church in Massachusetts, United States

Coordinates: 42.5071°N 70.8480°W

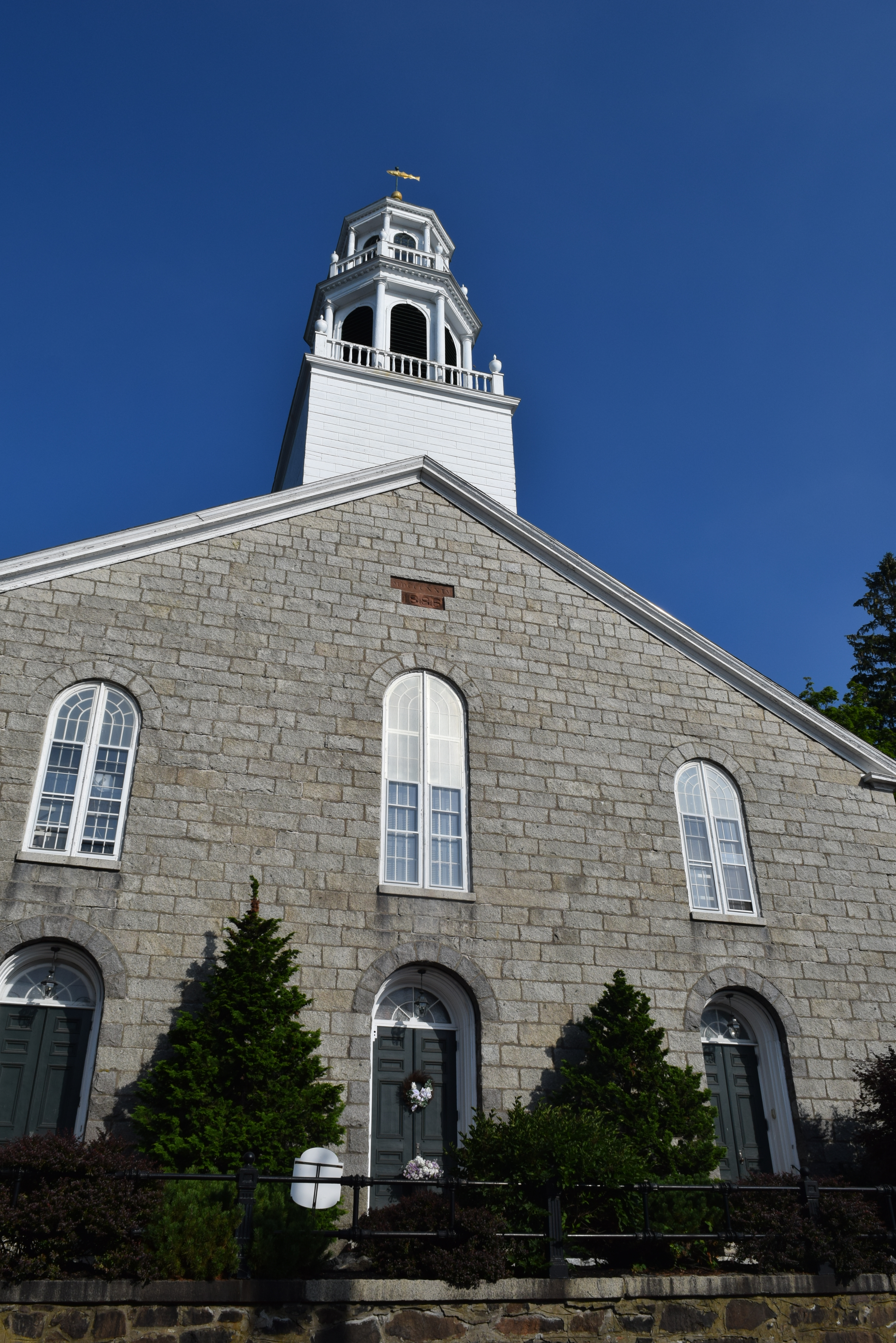

Old North Church is a church built in 1824, in Marblehead, Massachusetts for the First Congregational Church. It is built in the Colonial Georgian style.

Their current designated term associate pastor is Rev. Lindsay Popperson.
