= Zill (mango) =

Mango cultivar

Mangifera 'Zill'
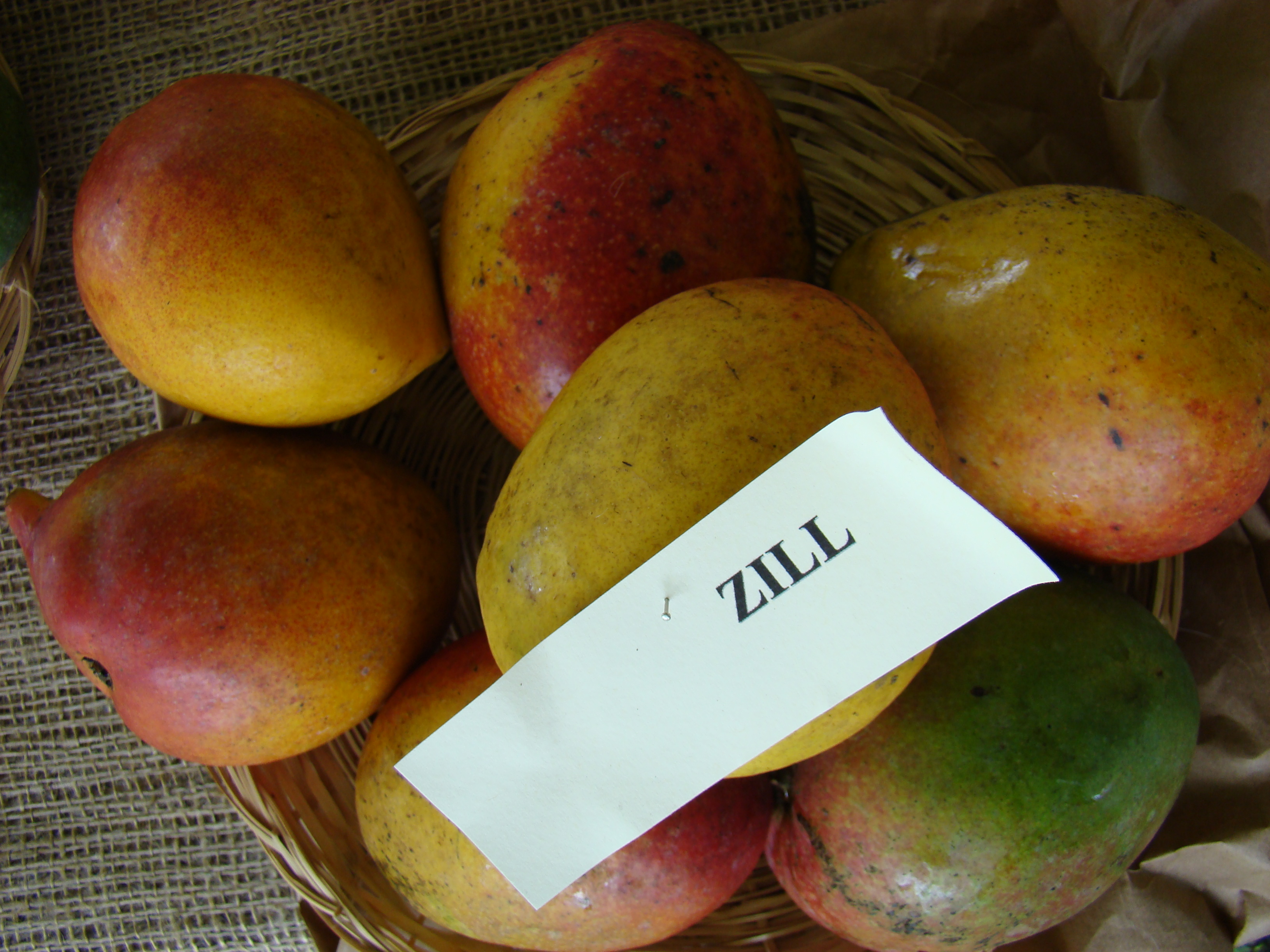
- Zill mangoes at the Redland Summer Fruit Festival, Fruit and Spice Park, Homestead, FL
- Genus: Mangifera
- Species: Mangifera indica
- Hybrid parentage: 'Haden' × 'Bombay'
- Cultivar: 'Zill'
- Breeder: Laurence H. Zill
- Origin: Florida, US

The 'Zill' mango is a named mango cultivar that originated in south Florida.

== History ==
The original tree reportedly grew from a 'Haden' seed planted in 1922 by Carl King of Lake Worth, Florida. A 2005 pedigree analysis estimated that Zill may have been a cross between Haden and Bombay. The tree later came into the possession of Laurence H. Zill, a horticulturalist and nursery owner whose family name the cultivar was named after. The tree first fruited in 1930, and Zill began to be propagated by Laurence Zill in 1940. The cultivar was named and described in 1945.

Thereafter, Zill became heavily propagated due to its color, eating quality, and good production. It was planted commercially and widely sold as nurserystock. While it fell out of favor as a commercial mango due to poor storage characteristics, Zill is now commercially grown in Africa and is still sold as a dooryard tree for home growers in Florida.

Zill trees are planted in the collections of the USDA's germplasm repository in Miami, Florida, the University of Florida's Tropical Research and Education Center in Homestead, Florida, and the Miami-Dade Fruit and Spice Park, also in Homestead.

Zill may be a parent of several Florida mangoes, including Dot, Jakarta, and Spirit of '76.

== Description ==
The fruit is oval to ovate in shape, with a rounded base and rounded apex, and contains a small lateral beak. The average weight at maturity is just under a pound. The thin skin is yellow with dark red blush covering much of it. The flesh is yellow and fiberless, with a sweet flavor and strong aroma that is sometimes compared to pineapple. It contains a monoembryonic seed. Zill typically ripens from May to July in Florida, though it has a tendency to ripen all at once during a 2-week period. Fruit production is considered good.

The trees are vigorous growers that develop large, spreading canopies.
