= Archibald Willard =

American painter (1836–1918)

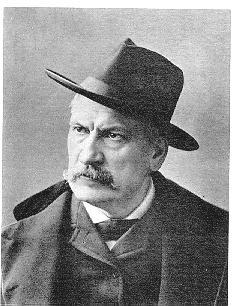
- Born: Archibald MacNeal Willard; August 22, 1836; Bedford, Ohio, U.S.
- Died: October 11, 1918 (aged 82); U.S.
- Known for: Painting
- Notable work: The Spirit of '76 (c. 1875)

Archibald MacNeal Willard (August 22, 1836 – October 11, 1918) was an American painter who was born and raised in Bedford, Ohio. His most famous work is The Spirit of '76.

== Early life ==
Willard was born in Bedford, Ohio, on August 22, 1836, the son of Samuel Willard, the pastor of Bedford Baptist Church. He had an interest in art ever since he was a child and often scribbled on barns and other structures at home.

== Career ==
As a young man, Willard moved to Wellington, Ohio, where he began working for wagon maker E.S. Tripp. He began as a basic wagon painter, but eventually was allowed to paint elaborate decorations that were popular at the time. Willard joined the 86th Ohio Infantry Regiment in 1863 and fought in the Civil War, but was not heavily involved. During this time, he painted several scenes from the war.

After the end of the Civil War, Willard created a pair of paintings for Tripp's daughter, Addie, called Pluck and Pluck No. 2. The first of the two features three children being carted by a dog chasing a rabbit, while in the second, the children and their cart have crashed due to their reckless pursuit. These paintings, among earlier sketches, forged a relationship between him and photographer James F. Ryder. Ryder made much of his money in chromolithography, printing popular and marketable images for the average household. He saw a potential in Willard to create humorous and cheerful paintings to make profits.

Willard painted The Spirit of '76 about 1875 in Wellington, Ohio after he saw a holiday parade pass through the town square. Willard also painted three murals in the main hall of the Fayette County courthouse in the city of Washington Court House, Ohio: The Spirit of Electricity, The Spirit of Telegraphy, and The Spirit of the Mail.

Willard is buried in Wellington, Ohio at the Greenwood Cemetery. He is commemorated by a Willard Avenue in his birthplace of Bedford and a Willard Drive in nearby Garfield Heights.

== The Spirit of '76 ==
The Spirit of '76 (aka Yankee Doodle)
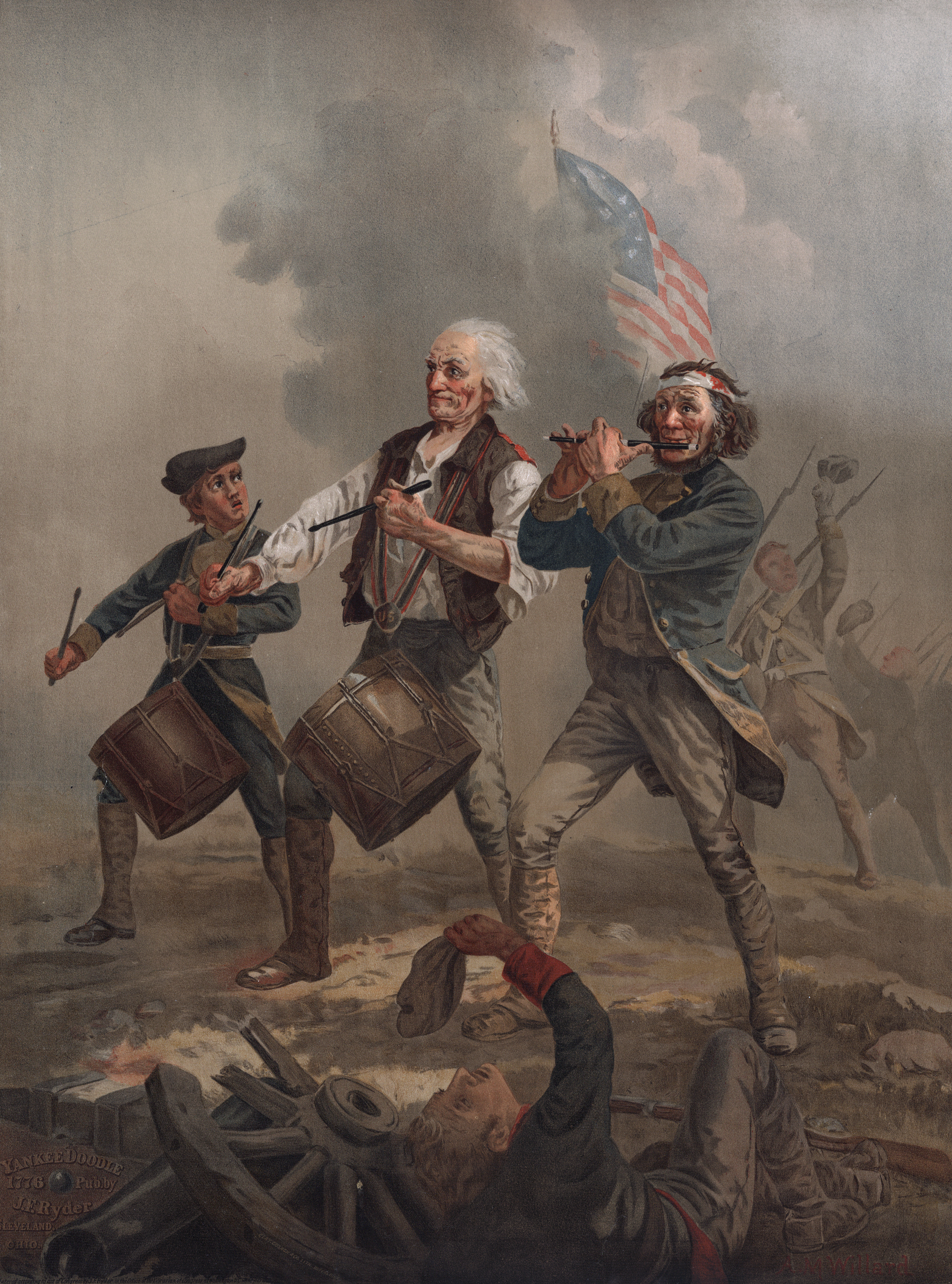
- Artist: Archibald Willard
- Year: c. 1875
- Type: oil
- Dimensions: 61 cm × 45 cm (24 in × 18 in)
- Location: Abbot Hall in Marblehead, Massachusetts

Willard's most famous work is The Spirit of '76, previously known as Yankee Doodle, which was exhibited at the Centennial Exposition in Philadelphia, Pennsylvania in 1876. Common myths claim that people were so inspired by it that Willard was invited to show his painting and that even then-President Grant gave his praise. However, it did not have such an initial popularity. It was placed in the Art Annex to make room for a large number of applications and it was scarcely advertised. It was not hailed by critics either, with one calling the work "oppressive". The success of the painting was largely due to Ryder's marketing of the chromolithographs, sold first at five dollars a piece and for less as the exhibition progressed. After the exhibition, the painting garnered enough popularity to tour across the country to large crowds.

The original painting is displayed at Abbot Hall in Marblehead, Massachusetts. Several later variations painted by Willard have been exhibited around the country, including in the United States Department of State.

Willard developed the painting from a sketch, which included three men dancing and singing. He used his father, Samuel Willard, as the model for the middle character of the painting. Hugh Mosher was the model for the fifer. The boy was Henry Devereaux. Including his father in the painting was something that set the painting apart from his usual, humorous style, since Willard felt sentimental toward his father's work as a minister and his grandfather's role in the Revolutionary War.

He also made several other works of art, including The Blue Girl, and others not as recognized. After the exhibition of The Spirit of '76 he saw himself as an elevated artist, despite the minimal critical acclaim. His later works were characterized as returns to The Spirit of '76 and his folksy retellings of U.S. history. They were hardly recognized and did not make him as much money. His prominence as an artist would only return briefly in 1895 when The Spirit of '76 and possibly another work by Willard's involving the same subjects marching into Havana were being advertised for the Spanish–American War.

=== Representation in other media ===
Spirit of '76 (1905), a film reenactment by Billy Bitzer

- The 1931 film Alexander Hamilton featured a live-action recreation of the painting at both the beginning and the end credits.
- The cover of the July 1939 issue of Mickey Mouse Magazine featured a parody of the painting with Mickey Mouse, Donald Duck, and Goofy substituted for the soldiers. The art was adapted by Disney in 1975 as part of the logo for America on Parade at Disneyland and Walt Disney World. It was the basis for the design of the opening float in the parade.
- The figures from the painting can be seen in the 1939 Merrie Melodies short Old Glory.
- The final scene of the 1950 Merrie Melodies short Bunker Hill Bunny, starring Bugs Bunny and Yosemite Sam, parodies the painting.
- On the 1961 comedy album Stan Freberg Presents the United States of America Volume One: The Early Years, the track "Yankee Doodle Go Home (Spirit of '76)" features the "hip" fife player and younger drummer objecting to the "square" playing of the older drummer.
- In the 1963 World War II film The Great Escape, Hilts (Steve McQueen) and Hendley (James Garner) are seen celebrating the 4th of July in a Nazi German POW camp. They wake up the camp in the morning by playing of "Yankee Doodle" and are dressed similarly to the characters in the painting.
- Kurt Vonnegut referred to the painting in his 1969 novel Slaughterhouse-Five, in a passage where the protagonist, Billy Pilgrim, walks through a POW camp near Dresden. Billy is thus described: "Billy was carrying his little coat as though it were a lady's muff. It was wrapped around and around his hands. He was the central clown in an unconscious travesty of that famous oil painting, The Spirit of '76."
- On January 1, 1976, the U.S. Postal Service issued three commemorative stamps based on the painting as part of the Bicentennial celebration. The triptych se-tenant postage stamps, titled Spirit of '76 were issued in sheets of fifty and denominated at 13c, which was the domestic letter rate.
- New York hardcore band Warzone used the painting for the cover of their 1996 LP The Sound of Revolution.
