= Bedford Baptist Church =

Historic church in Ohio, United States

- U.S. National Register of Historic Places
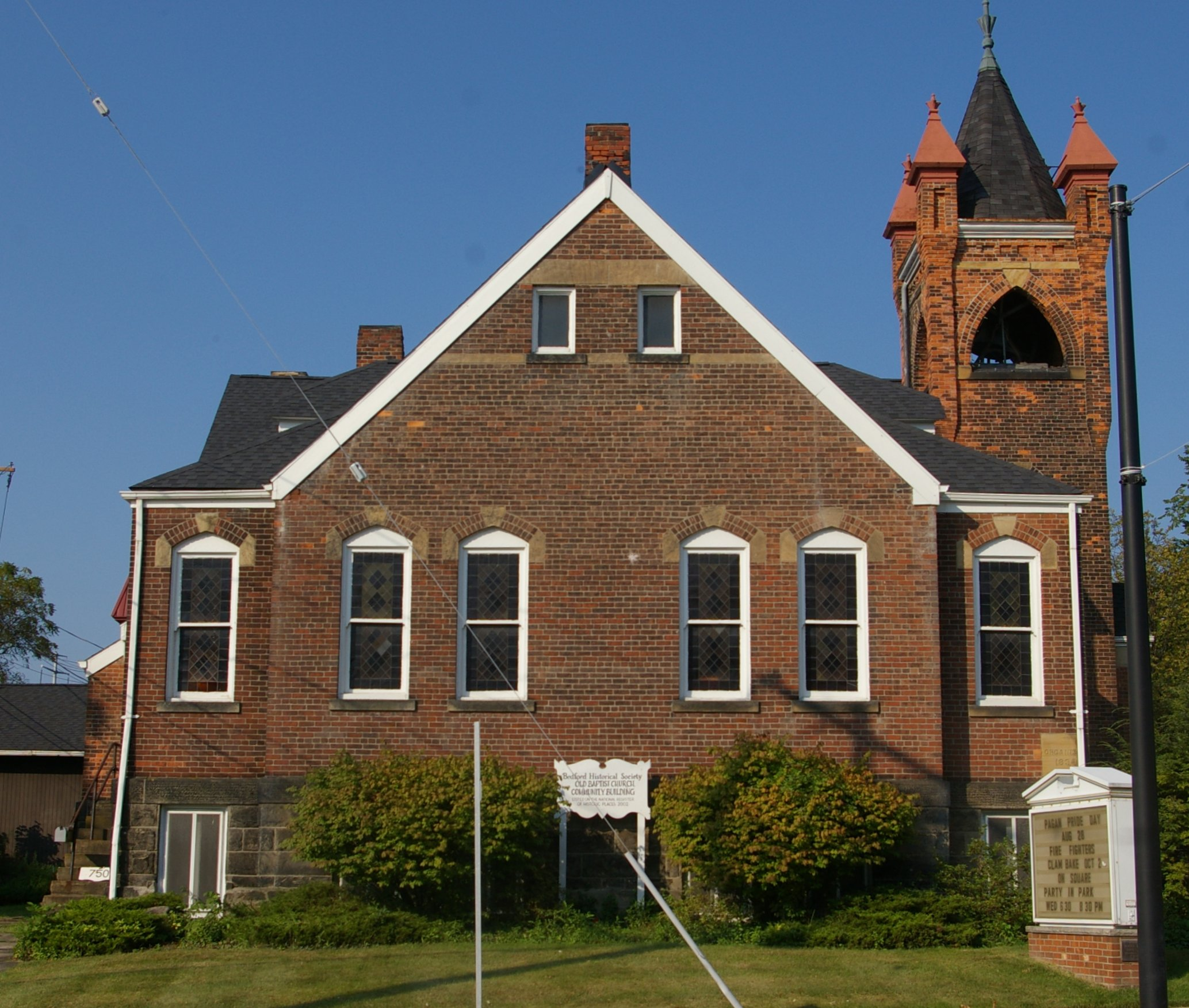

- Location within Ohio Location within the United States
- Location: 750 Broadway Ave., Bedford, Ohio
- Coordinates: 41°23′24″N 81°32′3″W
- Area: less than one acre
- Built: 1893
- Architect: Snyder, Jacob; Wheeler, C.H.
- Architectural style: Late Gothic Revival
- NRHP reference No.: 02001618
- Added to NRHP: December 27, 2002

Bedford Baptist Church (also known as Old Bedford Baptist Church or Bedford Community Building) is a historic church built in a Gothic Revival style. The church currently serves as a community building for the city. It was built in 1893, and added to the National Register in 2002.
