= Abbot Hall (Marblehead, Massachusetts) =

- U.S. National Register of Historic Places
- U.S. Historic district – Contributing property
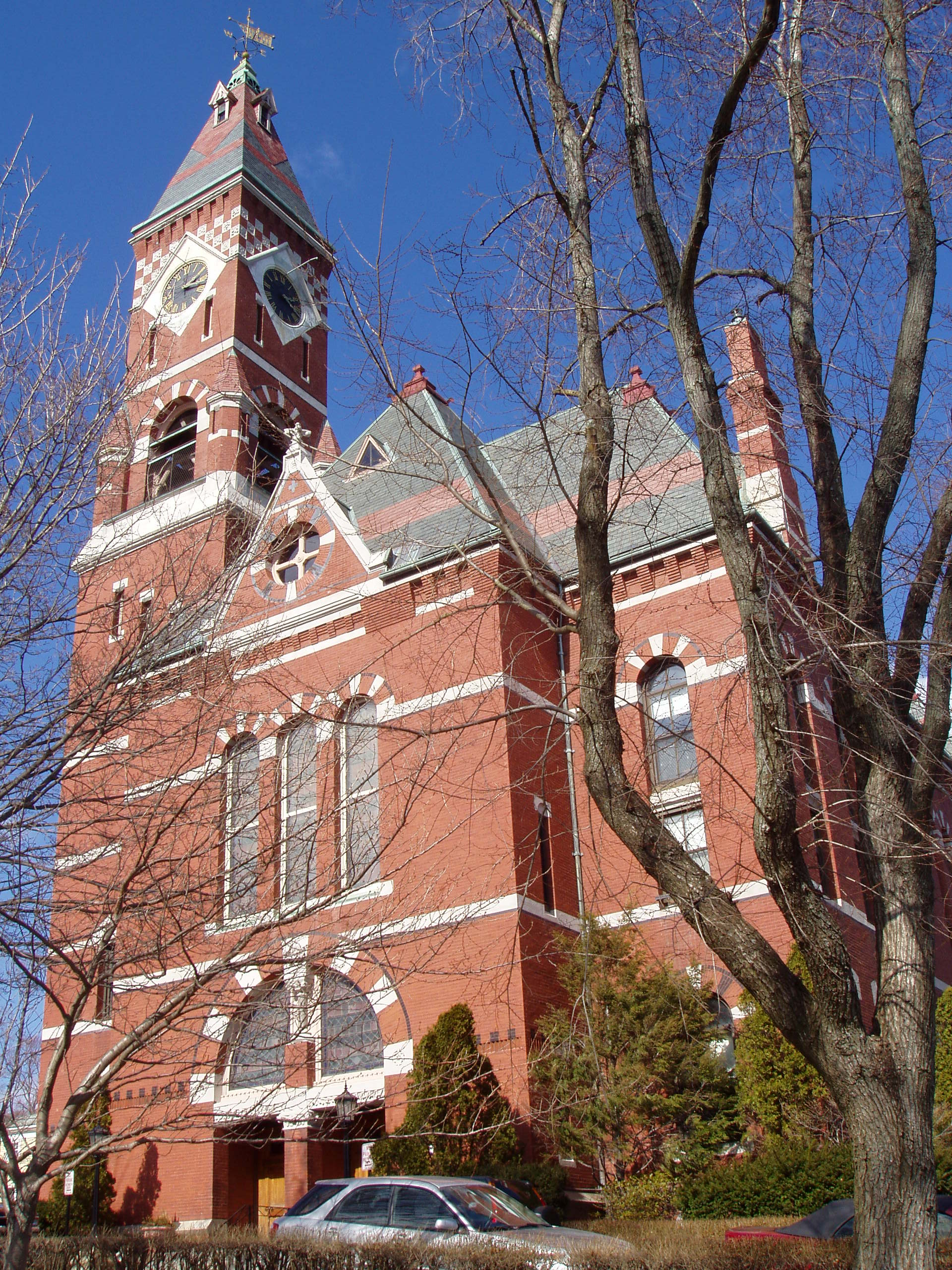
- Abbot Hall, Marblehead, Massachusetts.
- Location: Marblehead, Massachusetts
- Coordinates: 42°30′8.94″N 70°51′10.04″W
- Built: 1876
- Architect: Lord & Fuller
- Architectural style: Romanesque
- Part of: Marblehead Historic District (ID84002402)
- NRHP reference No.: 74000374

Significant dates
- Added to NRHP: September 6, 1974
- Designated CP: January 10, 1984

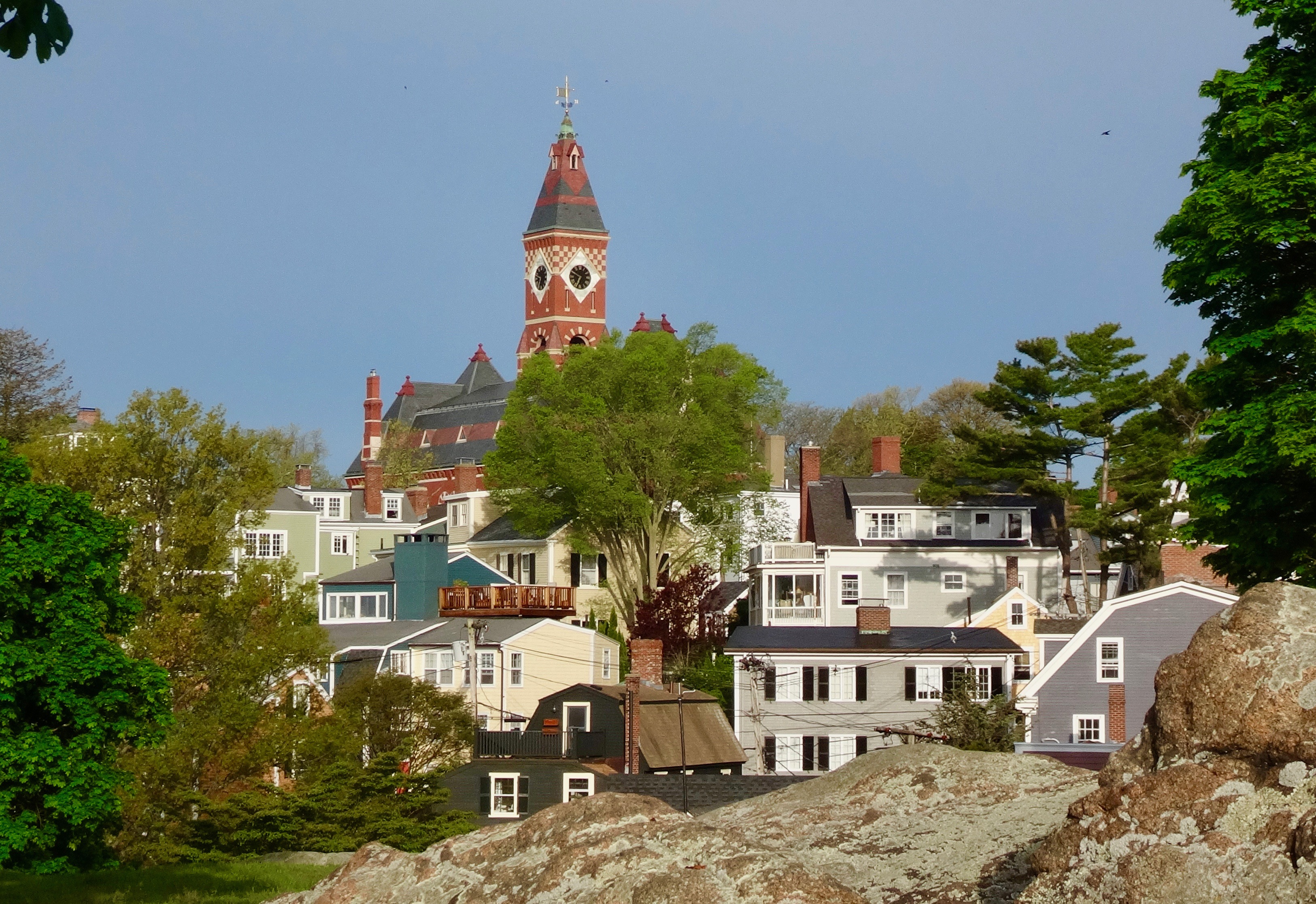
Abbot Hall, seat of Marblehead's town government

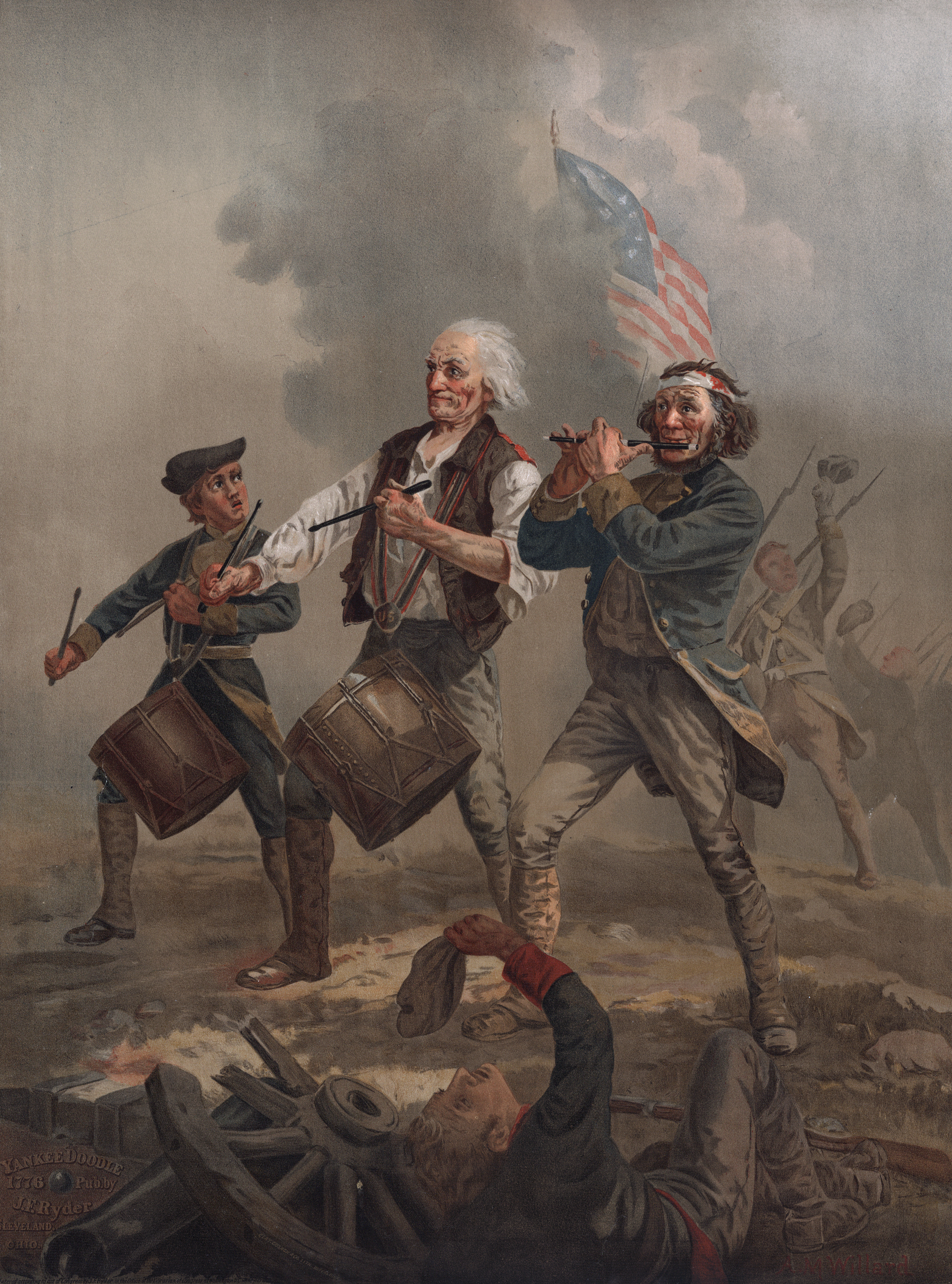
The Spirit of '76 by Archibald MacNeal Willard (c. 1875)

Abbot Hall is a town hall and historical museum located at 188 Washington Street, Marblehead, Massachusetts. It is open year-round, though with restricted hours in the colder months. Constructed in 1876 and designed in the Romanesque style by Lord & Fuller architects, the Hall is listed on the National Register of Historic Places as a contributing property in the historic district.

== History ==
Abbot Hall is the fourth town hall built in Marblehead, preceded by the First Meeting House (1638, Old Burial Hill), the Old Meeting House (1696), and the Old Town House (1727). Abbot Hall is named after a barrel maker and trader named Benjamin Abbot. When Benjamin Abbot died in 1872, he donated his fortune to the town of Marblehead.

In addition to serving as the seat of Marblehead's town government, Abbot Hall has holdings as a museum. It contains the original The Spirit of '76 by Archibald MacNeal Willard, which was widely reproduced, the 1684 deed to Marblehead signed by descendants of Wenepoykin, youngest son of Nanepashemet, chief or sachem of the regional Pawtucket confederation of Abenaki peoples prior to Pilgrim settlement, a bust of native son and U.S. vice president Elbridge Gerry, a painting of Marbleheaders rowing George Washington across the Delaware River during the American Revolutionary War, a painting by primitivist J.O.J. Frost, and a number of other historical artifacts. A plaque on display in the Selectmen's room, discovered in the Philadelphia Navy Yard, proclaims Marblehead the "Birthplace of the American Navy".

== Clock ==
The clock in the tower of Abbot Hall is a Howard #2S installed in 1877; it is governed by a 10 ft (3.0 m) pendulum escapement, driven by an 86 lb (39 kg) weight. The clangor escapement is governed by a flutter vane assembly and is powered by a 292 lb (132 kg) weight. The Bell was cast by Meneely & Kimberly in Troy, New York and donated by James J. H. Gregory Every week the maintenance workers ascend the tower to wind the movements. Local authors have featured the clock in numerous stories.

== See also ==
- National Register of Historic Places listings in Essex County, Massachusetts
