= Carrie (mango) =

Mango cultivar

Mangifera 'Carrie'
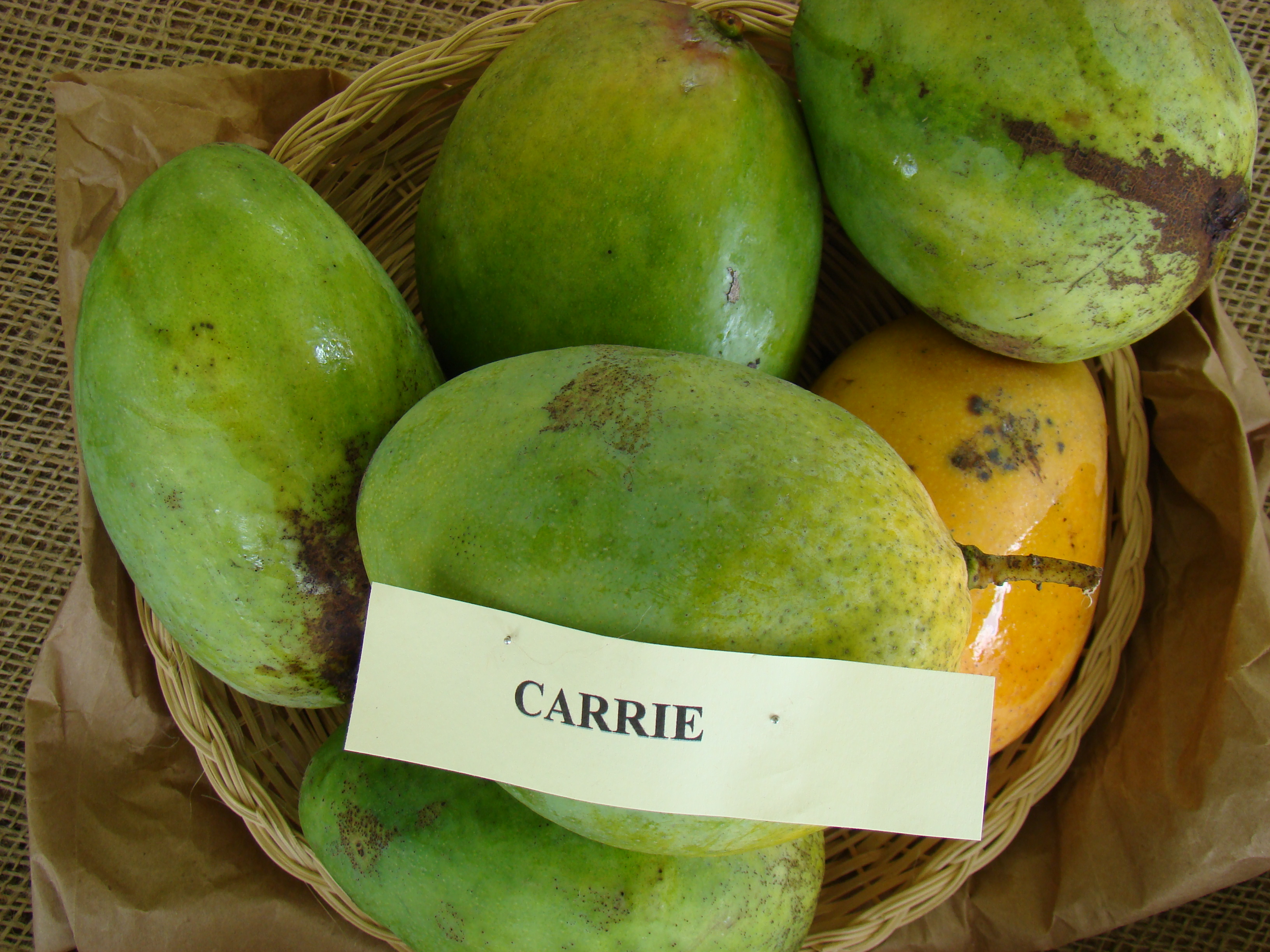
- A display of Carrie mango at the Redland Summer Fruit Festival, Fruit and Spice Park, Homestead, Florida
- Genus: Mangifera
- Species: Mangifera indica
- Hybrid parentage: 'Julie'
- Cultivar: 'Carrie'
- Breeder: Laurence H. Zill
- Origin: Florida, USA

The 'Carrie' mango is a named mango cultivar that originated in south Florida, USA. It was first grown in Boynton Beach, Florida, and became known for its excellent eating qualities and good disease resistance, and popularity as a dooryard mango variety.

== History ==
The original tree was grown on the property of Laurence H. Zill in Boynton Beach, Florida and was reportedly a seedling of the 'Sophie Fry' mango. A pedigree analysis of the Florida mangoes conducted in 2005 that did not include Sophie Fry instead the study found Julie to be the most likely parent, though Julie is also the parent of Sophie Fry. The Carrie tree was named after Lawrence Zill's mother, Carrie Zill. It first fruited in 1940 and commercial propagation began in 1949. Thereafter Carrie gained a reputation for having excellent eating qualities and good disease resistance. Its commercial application was limited due to the fruit's lack of color and soft flesh, but it became a popular dooryard variety in Florida.

Carrie trees are planted in the collections of the USDA's germplasm repository in Miami, Florida, the University of Florida's Tropical Research and Education Center in Homestead, Florida, and the Miami-Dade Fruit and Spice Park, also in Homestead.

== Description ==
The fruit is small, averaging a pound or less, and ripens from June to July in Florida. At maturity it may be green to yellow, but the fruit doesn't develop red blush like other mangoes. The flesh is not fibrous, is orange and rich in flavor with a strong aroma, and contains a monoembryonic seed. The fruit are highly resistant to fungus.

The trees can be vigorous growers, but their compact growth habit makes them easy to manage. They have dense, rounded canopies. The leaves are distinctive for being somewhat wider than most mango leaves.

== See also ==
- List of mango cultivars
- Julie - popular in the Caribbean
