= Hammock Park =

Hammock Park may refer to:

- Hammock Park (Dunedin, Florida), a park in Dunedin, Florida
- Matheson Hammock Park, a 630acre urban park in metropolitan Miami
- Hammocks Beach State Park, a North Carolina state park in Onslow County
- Simpson Park Hammock, a 7.8 acre urban park located between Brickell and The Roads neighborhoods of Miami
- Highlands Hammock State Park, a 9000-acre park west of Sebring in Highlands County, Florida
- San Felasco Hammock Preserve State Park, a Florida State Park in Alachua County, Florida
- Curry Hammock State Park, a Florida State Park along both sides of US 1
- Dagny Johnson Key Largo Hammock Botanical State Park, a Florida State Park on the northern tip of Key Largo
- Annutteliga Hammock, a 2,200 acre park and preserve in Hernando County, Florida
- Fickett Hammock Preserve
