= Lancetilla =

Mango cultivar

Coordinates: 15.7500°N 87.4167°W

Mangifera 'Lancetilla'
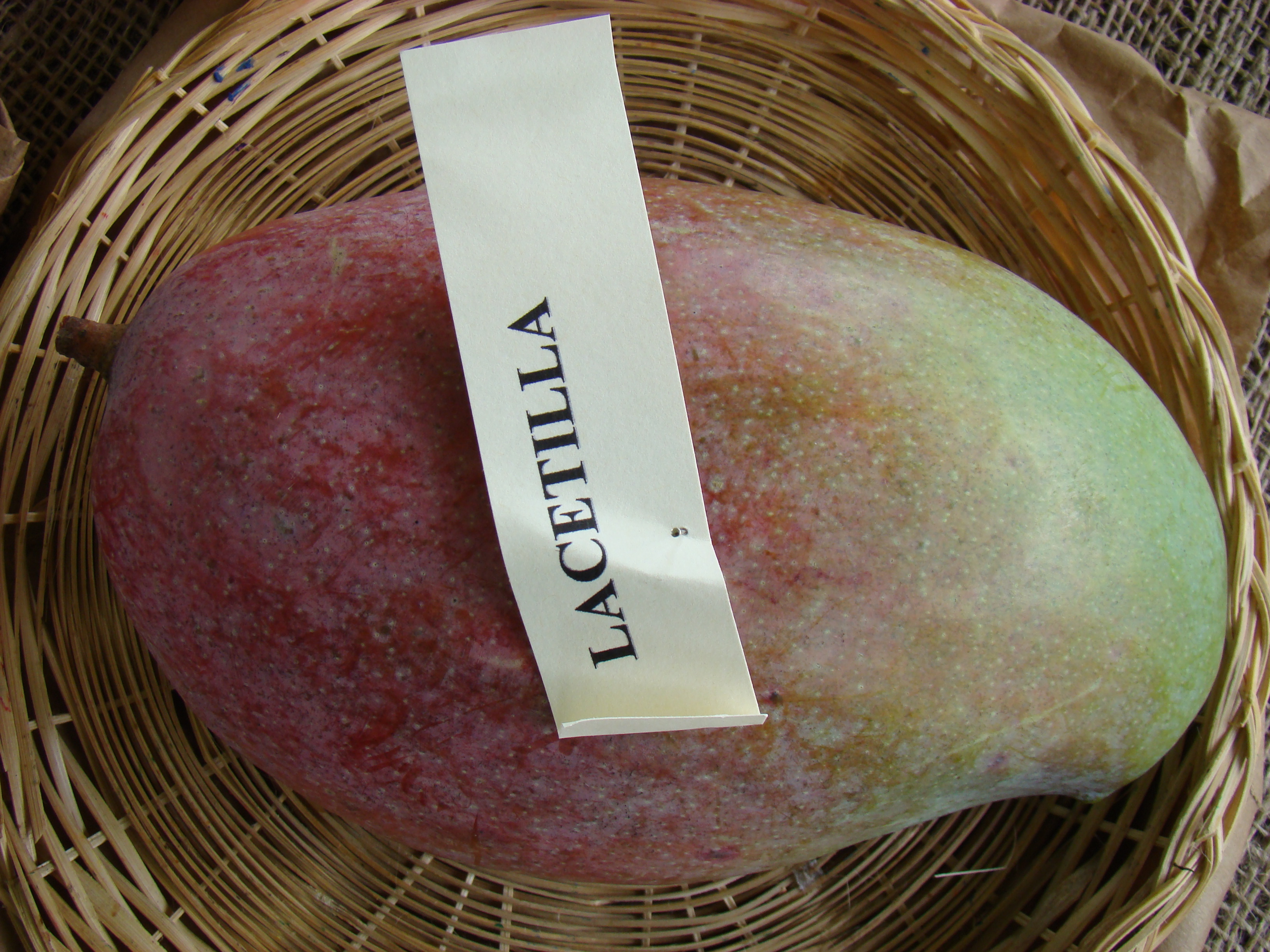
- Display of a 'Lancetilla' mango at the Redland Summer Fruit Festival, Fruit and Spice Park, Homestead, Florida
- Genus: Mangifera
- Hybrid parentage: 'Saigon' × 'Mulgoba'
- Cultivar: 'Lancetilla'
- Breeder: Wilson Popenoe
- Origin: Honduras

The 'Lancetilla' mango is a named mango cultivar that originated in Honduras.

== History ==
The original tree is believed to have been the result of a cross between the Saigon and Mulgoba varieties by Wilson Popenoe, grown on his property in Lancetilla on the north coast of Honduras.

Lancetilla was introduced to the United States via South Florida and first received notoriety at the Fairchild Tropical Botanic Garden's 2001 mango festival. The tree was promoted as a dooryard variety in Florida due to its excellent disease resistance and flavor, and is now widely sold as nursery stock in the state.

A Lancetilla tree is planted in the collection of the Miami–Dade Redland Fruit & Spice Park in Homestead, Florida.

== Description ==
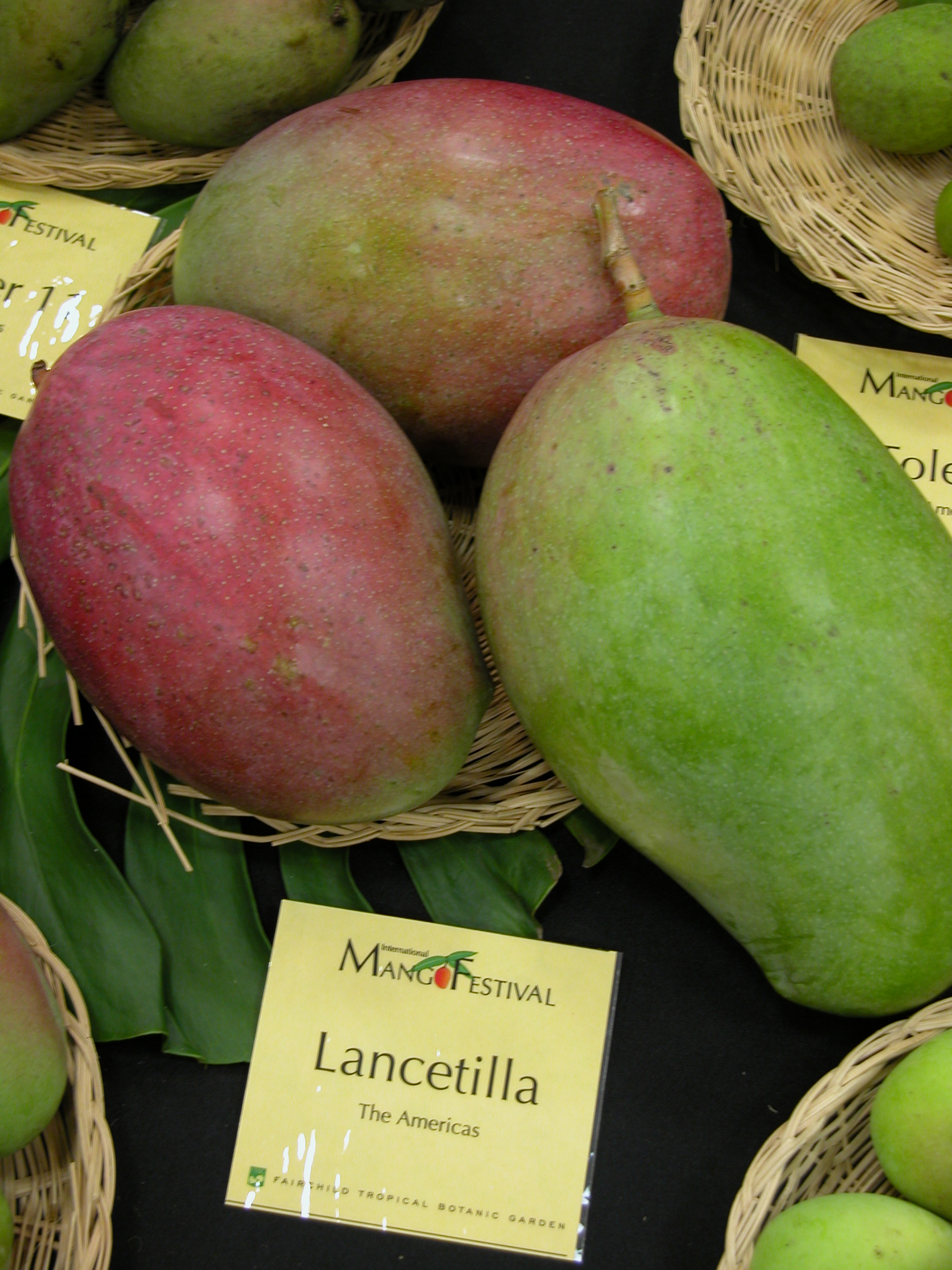
Display of 'Lancetilla' mangoes at the 15th Annual International Mango Festival, Fairchild Tropical Botanic Garden, Coral Gables, Florida.

The fruits are quite large at maturity, averaging around 2 pounds, some even weighing as much as 5 pounds. The skin color is red, and the fruit have a long, flattened oval shape. The flesh is lemon yellow in color, completely fiberless, and has a very sweet flavor. It contains a monoembryonic seed. Lancetilla typically matures from August to September in Florida, making it a late season mango.

The trees can be kept at a compact height of around 10 feet with consistent pruning.
