= Mulgoba =

Mango cultivar

Mangifera 'Mulgoba'
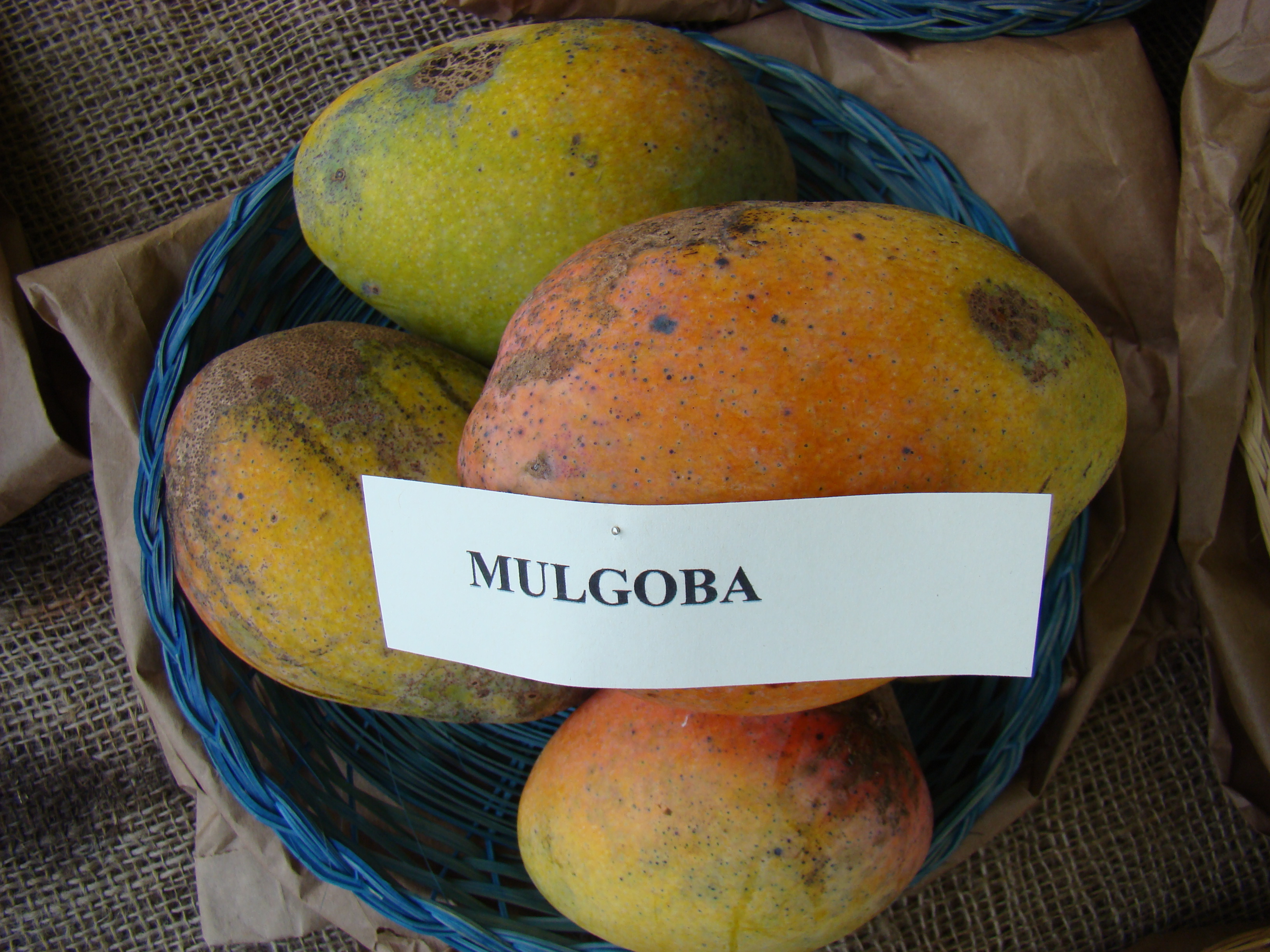
- Display of 'Mulgoba' mango at the Redland Summer Fruit Festival, Fruit and Spice Park, Homestead, Florida
- Genus: Mangifera
- Cultivar: 'Mulgoba'
- Origin: India

Malgova or Malgoa is an important mango cultivar mainly grown in Tamilnadu, Kerala and Karnataka and also in other parts of South India. It is a large round fruit (typically 300-500 g), it has a small hard seed inside and is very juicy and fragrant. It is generally considered to be one of the best mangoes. Its production area is centred on the districts of Salem, Dharmapuri and Krishnagiri in Tamil Nadu, Gujarat, as well as neighbouring parts of Andhra Pradesh and Karnataka.

A variety that was transplanted in Florida is called Mulgoba (very likely due to a mislabeling). A strain is also grown in Malaysia. The US variety is somewhat smaller, and may even be a different strain.

A DNA analysis of 50 varieties of mango obtained several DNA clusters but found the Malgova to be the most distinct.

== Description ==
The Malgova is a round mango which retains a green colour (with hints of red) when ripe. It is roundish-oblique, in shape, with a blunt apex and has a smaller lateral beak than other mangoes. For the size of fruit, the stone is small. The Florida variety is more yellowish with some crimson blush. The fiber-less flesh is yellow, soft, and has a flavor that is rich, spicy, and sweet. It contains a monoembryonic seed. It is a late-ripening mango, harvested typically around May (July/August in Florida). It has low acidity (0.11) with a pH of 4.65.

The trees are vigorous growers and will grow to large sizes with spreading, open canopies.

== History in the United States ==
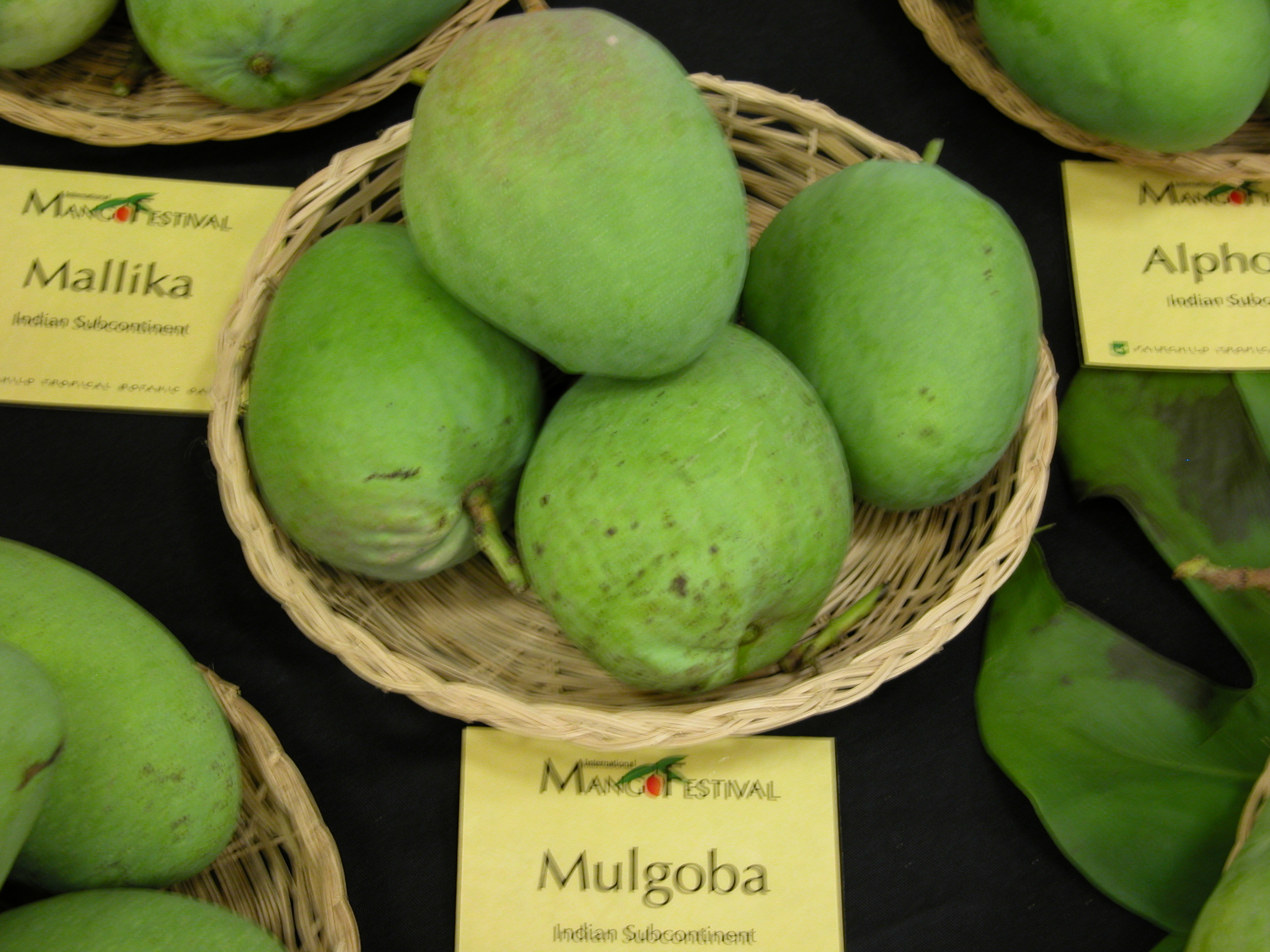
Display of unripe Florida 'Mulgoba' mango at the 15th Annual International Mango Festival at the Fairchild Tropical Botanic Garden in Coral Gables, Florida.

There is considerable speculation as to the origin of the American 'Mulgoba' variety. What is known is that 'Mulgoba' was sent from India to the US in 1889 as part of a program to introduce tropical fruit to America. Twelve grafted mango trees were shipped by G. Marshall Woodrow, who was then Professor of Horticulture at the Agricultural College in Poona, India. The trees were brought from Bombay to Washington D.C., where they arrived in poor condition. The varieties included 'Alphonse', 'Banchore', 'Banchore of Dhiren', 'Devarubria', 'Mulgoba', and 'Pirie'. Upon receipt of the trees, they were then shipped to south Florida to be cared for by horticulturists. Five of the trees were sent to Professor Elbridge Gale along Lake Worth Lagoon near what is now West Palm Beach, Florida. Gale was a retired horticulture professor from Kansas State Agricultural College. One of these trees were labeled "Mulgoba" by Woodrow, which most likely was a mislabelling of Malgova, a well known mango cultivar in India.

10 of the 12 trees were killed by 1895, most presumably in a major freeze that affected Florida in the winter of 1894–1895. In 1898, Gale reported that only an 'Alphonse' tree under the care of the Brelsford Brothers and the 'Mulgoba' under his care were the two surviving trees. The 'Alphonse' was said to be doing poorly, but the same year the 'Mulgoba' produced its first fruit. However, the fruit resembled nothing like the 'Mulgoba' variety in India, nor any other established Indian varieties for that matter. Thus, several possibilities exist that could help explain the origin of the 'Mulgoba'. One is that the variety shipped to the United States was not 'Mulgoa' but rather another unknown variety. This explanation is challenging however as the 'Mulgoba' does not fit the description of any of the known mango varieties 'Alphonso', 'Mulgoba' grown around south Gujarat and Bombay, from where the scions for the original grafts were obtained. Yet another possibility is that the scion for the grafted tree that fruited in 1898 was killed in the 1894-1895 freeze, and that the rootstock was what grew and produced the fruit. This would help explain why the tree did not produce fruit until 1898, as most grafted trees will produce within 5 years. This would mean that 'Mulgoba' originated as a chance seedling of a superior variety, though such varieties were rarely used as rootstocks for grafted trees in India, complicating this explanation.

After the original tree began producing fruit, the 'Mulgoba' was quickly recognized for its outstanding eating quality and eye-catching color. Because of this, 'Mulgoba' was propagated and other trees were planted in Florida.

'Mulgoba' was a parent of the Haden mango, which was planted from a 'Mulgoba seed and was the result of a cross between the 'Mulgoba' and 'Turpentine 10' mango. 'Haden' would go on to become the parent of many of the Florida mangoes, and thus most Florida mangoes are descended from 'Mulgoba'. 'Mulgoba' was also reportedly a parent of the 'Lancetilla' mango, as well as the 'Keitt' mango, though a 2005 pedigree analysis indicated that 'Keitt' wasn't descended from 'Mulgoba'.

'Mulgoba' itself, while highly regarded for its flavor, proved to be a very poor and inconsistent producer in Florida, thus limiting its plantings after the development of 'Haden' and other cultivars with superior production characteristics. 'Mulgoba' never became an established commercial cultivar and has not been sold as nursery stock for decades. However, 'Mulgoba' trees are still part of the collections of the USDA's germplasm repository in Miami, Florida, the University of Florida's Tropical Research and Education Center in Homestead, Florida, and the Miami-Dade Fruit and Spice Park, also in Homestead.
