= Jakarta (mango) =

Mango cultivar

Mangifera 'Jakarta'
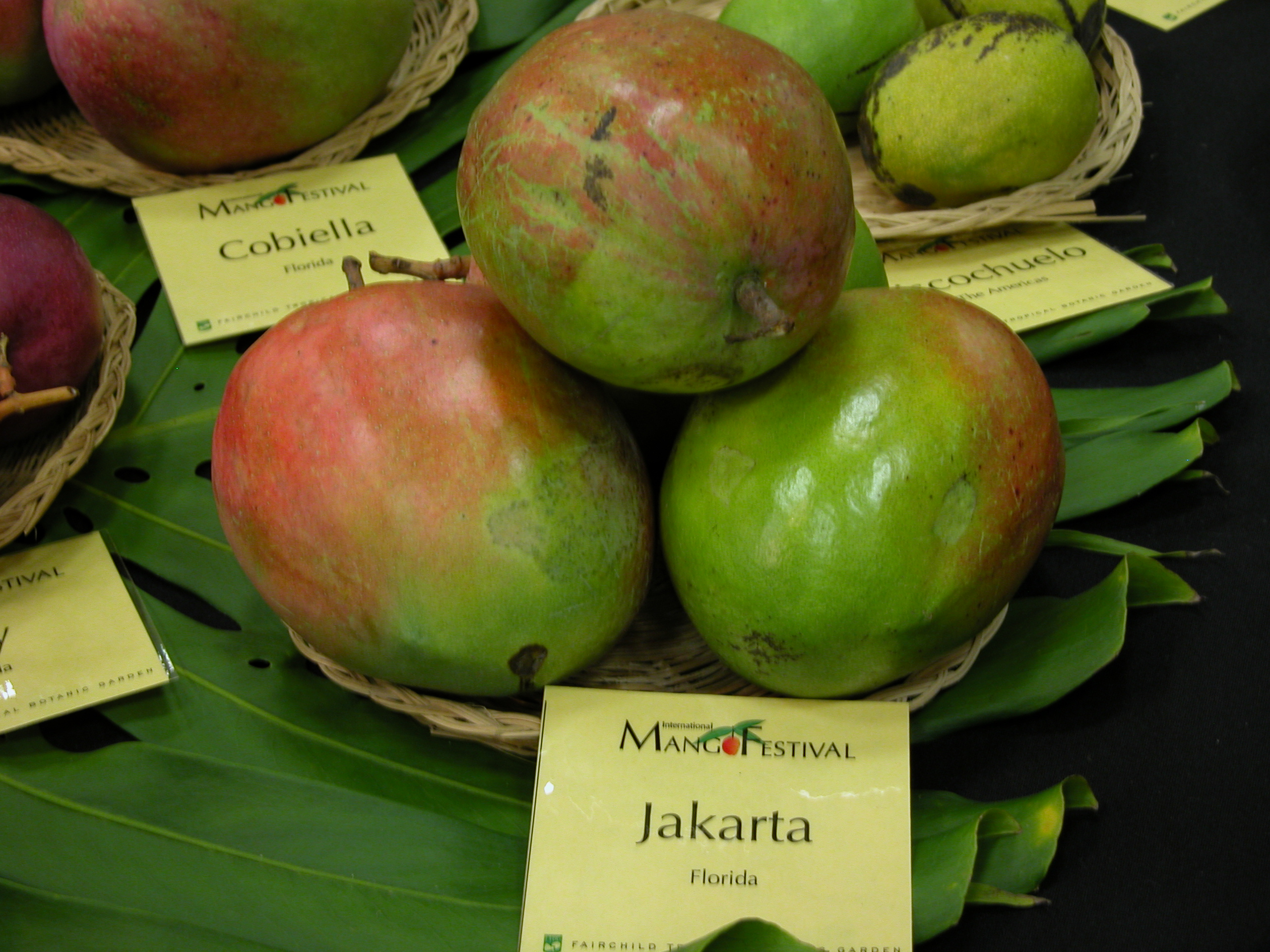
- Display of 'Jakarta' mango at the 15th Annual International Mango Festival at the Fairchild Tropical Botanic Garden in Coral Gables, Florida
- Genus: Mangifera
- Hybrid parentage: 'Zill' × 'Kent'
- Cultivar: 'Jakarta'
- Origin: Florida, US

The 'Jakarta' mango is a named mango cultivar that originated in south Florida.

== History ==
The original tree was grown on the property of Laurence Zill in Boynton Beach, Florida, and was reportedly a seedling of the Paheri mango. A 2005 pedigree analysis indicated that Jakarta was likely the result of a cross between the 'Bombay' and 'Kent' varieties.

Jakarta did not gain widespread acceptance as a commercial mango; however, it did find a market as a nursery stock and dooryard tree in Florida.

Jakarta trees are part of the collections of the USDA's National Germplasm Repository in Miami, FL, and the Miami–Dade Fruit and Spice Park in Homestead, FL.

== Description ==
The fruit has a round to oblong shape, and develops a distinctive sunset orange–red color at maturity, averaging a little over a pound in weight. The flesh is yellow and fiberless, with a uniquely resinous but rich flavor and aroma, and contains a monoembryonic seed. The fruit mature from June to August in Florida.

Jakarta trees are vigorous growers and form dense, rounded canopies.
