= Snapper Creek =

River in the United States of America

Coordinates: 25°41′31″N 80°18′42″W

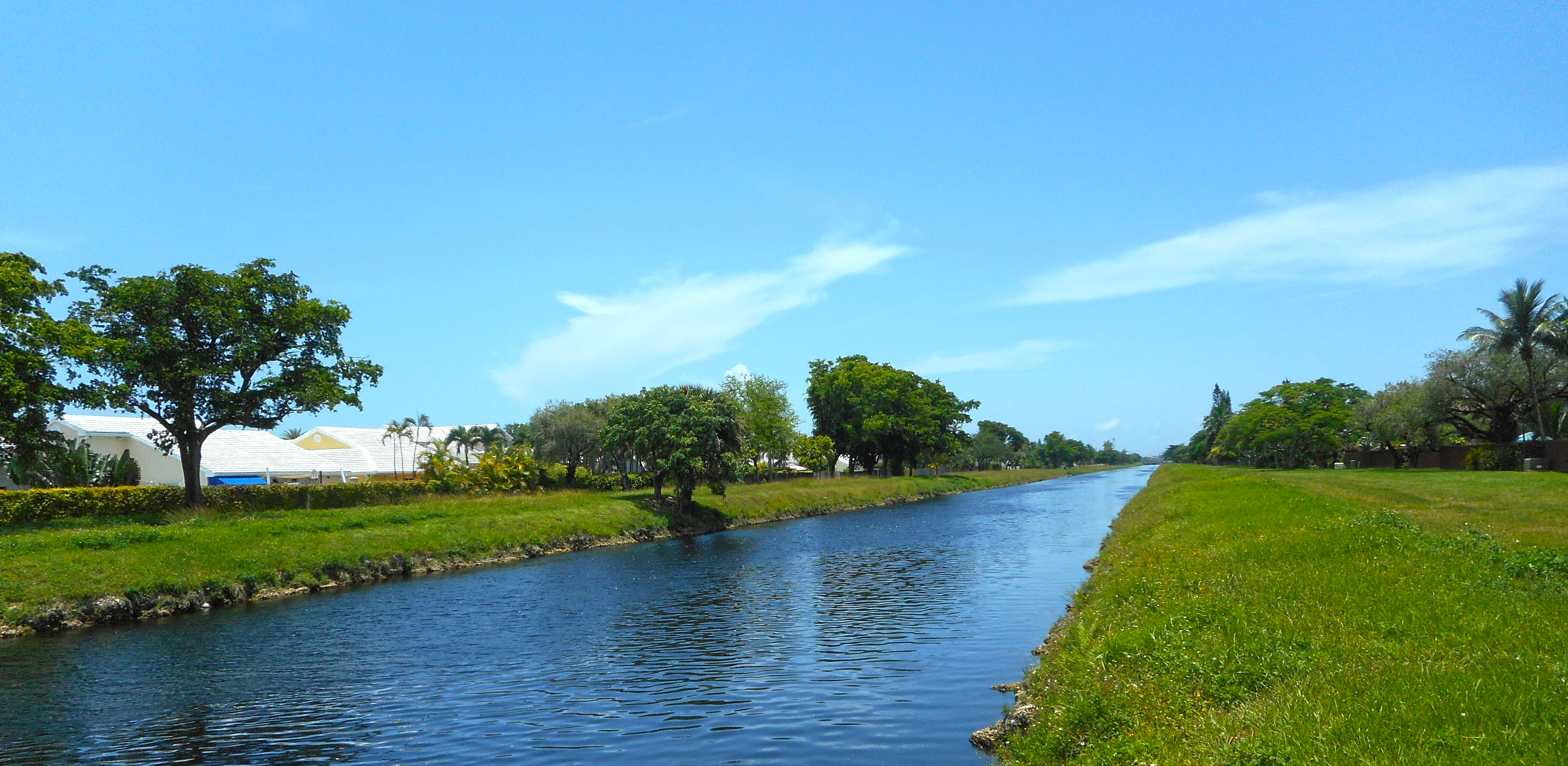
- Snapper Creek east of the Florida Turnpike

Location
- Country: United States

Physical characteristics
- Source
  - location: Everglades
  - elevation: 7 ft (2.1 m)
- Mouth
  - location: Matheson Hammock Park
  - elevation: 21 ft (6.4 m)
- Length: 4 mi (6.4 km)
- Basin size: 120 mi^{2} (310 km^{2})
- Discharge
  - average: 800 cu ft/s (23 m^{3}/s)

Basin features
- Tributaries
  - left: Everglades

The Snapper Creek is a creek in the U.S. state of Florida that drains out of the Everglades into Biscayne Bay at Biscayne National Park. It is a 4-mile (6.4 km) long creek 15 miles (24 km) south of Downtown Miami, running through the suburbs of Kendall and Coral Gables in metropolitan Miami. The creek extends from Biscayne Bay inland to the Snapper Creek Canal, which extends 10 miles (16 km) further to the Everglades.

== History ==
Originally shallow in depth, the westernmost parts of creek have since been dredged and the original river connected to a canal system. This effort was spearheaded as a part of flood mitigation efforts in the 1940s by the Florida State Board of Conservation, who lobbied for the creation of South Florida Water Management District in 1948. The flood protection system intensified after extensive flooding in South Florida following the 1947 Fort Lauderdale Hurricane and the population explosion in Greater Miami and subsequent urban sprawl following World War II.
