= Keitt =

Keitt may refer to:

- Laurence M. Keitt, South Carolina politician
- Keitt (mango), mango cultivar
