= Andrews Memorial Chapel (Dunedin, Florida) =

Historic church in Florida, United States

- U.S. National Register of Historic Places
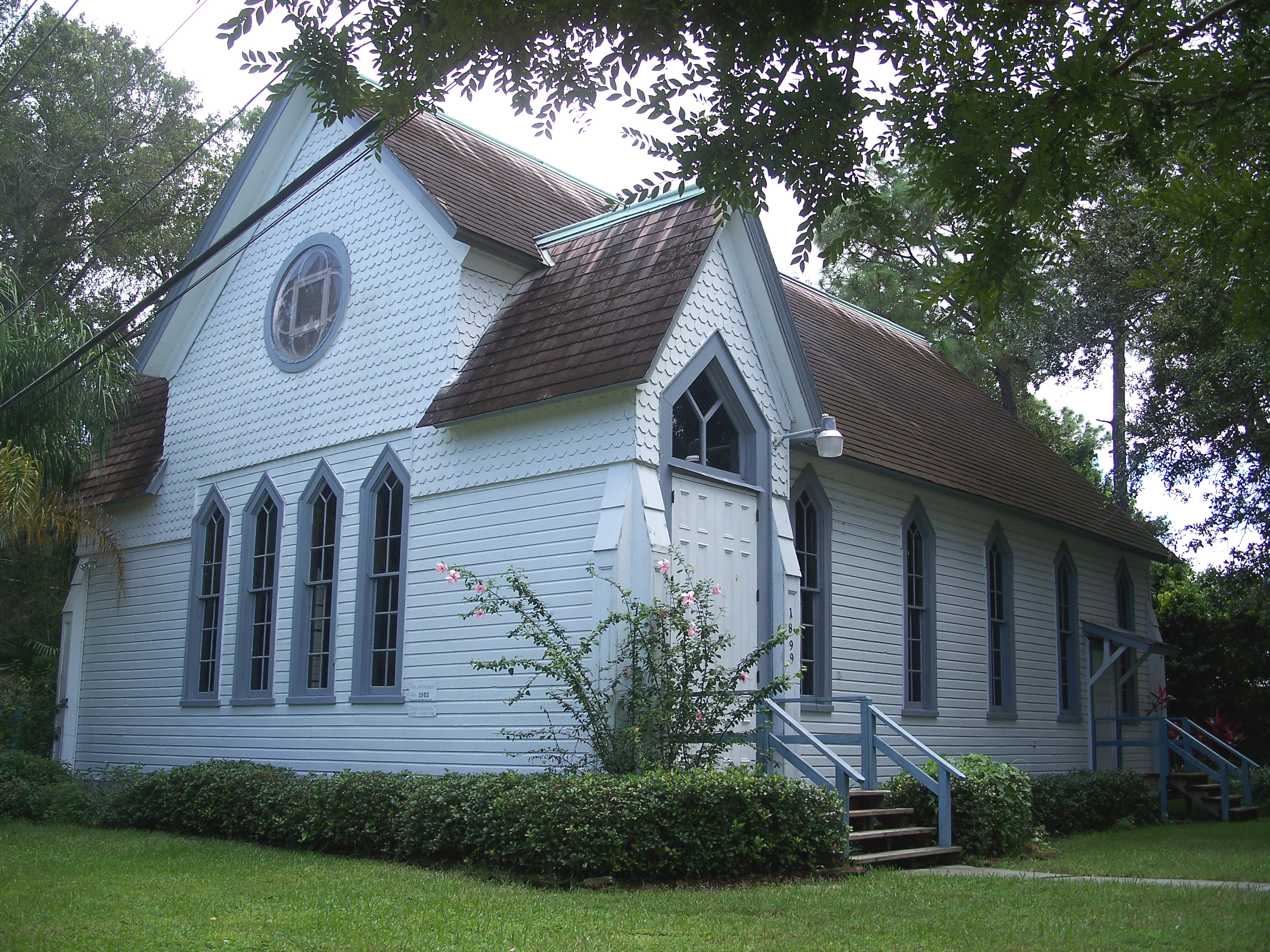
- Andrews Memorial Chapel

- Location within Florida Location within the United States
- Location: 1899 San Mateo Drive, Dunedin, Florida
- Coordinates: 28°1′52″N 82°47′9″W
- Built: 1888
- Architectural style: Carpenter Gothic
- NRHP reference No.: 72000346
- Added to NRHP: July 31, 1972

The Andrews Memorial Chapel is a historic Carpenter Gothic-style former Presbyterian church building now located in Dunedin, Florida. It was built in 1888 as the Andrews Memorial Church on the corner of Scotland Street and Highland Avenue. Its name was carried over from an 1871 Presbyterian church located where the Dunedin Cemetery is now and commemorates William Andrews, son of John G. Andrews, who "died while riding a horse in a violent storm." The church is located next to Hammock Park (Dunedin, Florida).

In 1926 the building was renamed Andrews Memorial Chapel and moved south on Scotland Street to make way for what is now the First Presbyterian Church of Dunedin. In 1970 it was bought by the Dunedin Historical Society, which had it cut in half and moved to its present location. Restoration work began in 1974. Today it is open for visits on Sundays from 2 to 4 PM, and is maintained by the society as a popular venue for weddings, concerts and other events.

On July 31, 1972, it was added to the National Register of Historic Places.

== Gallery ==
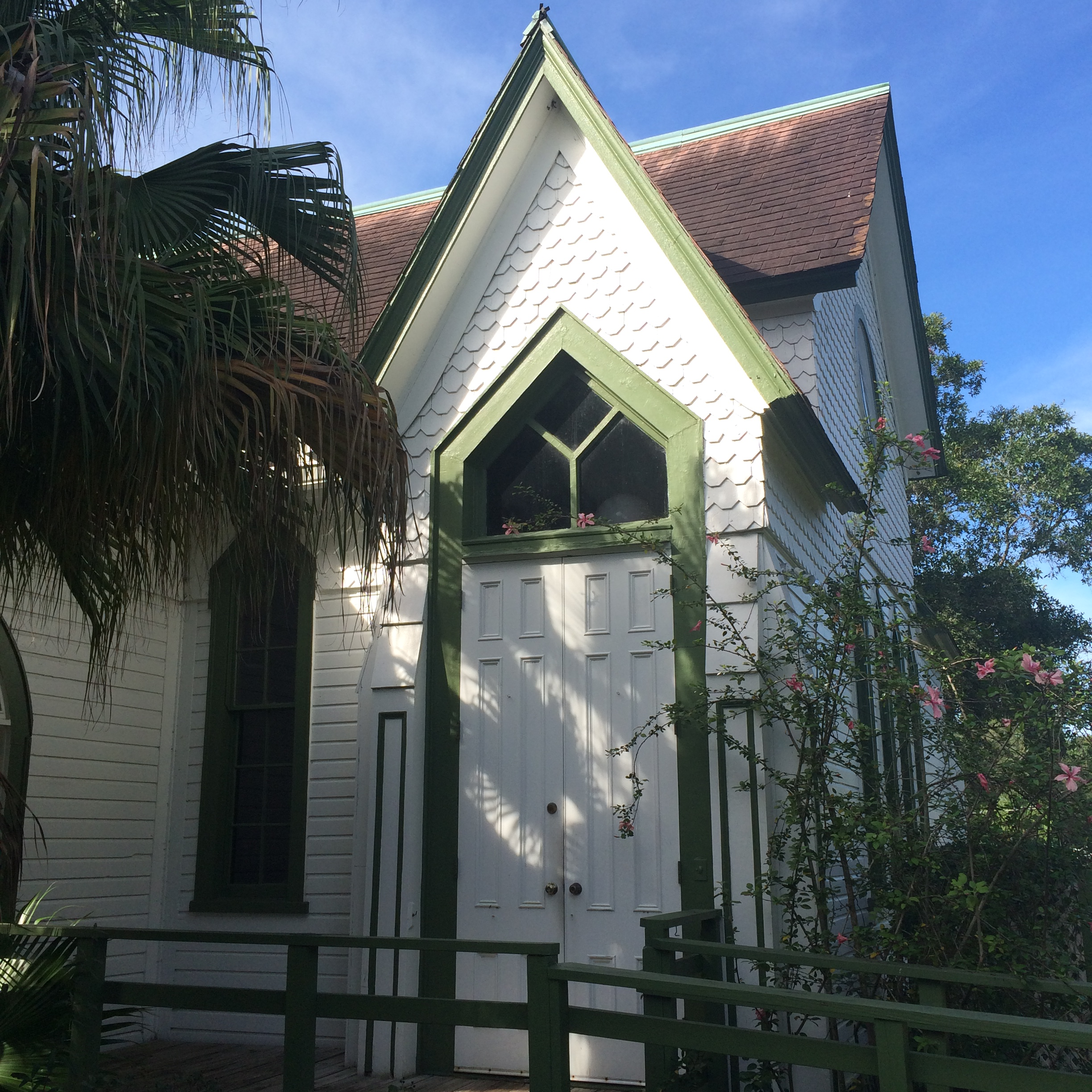
Narthex with cathedral style windows

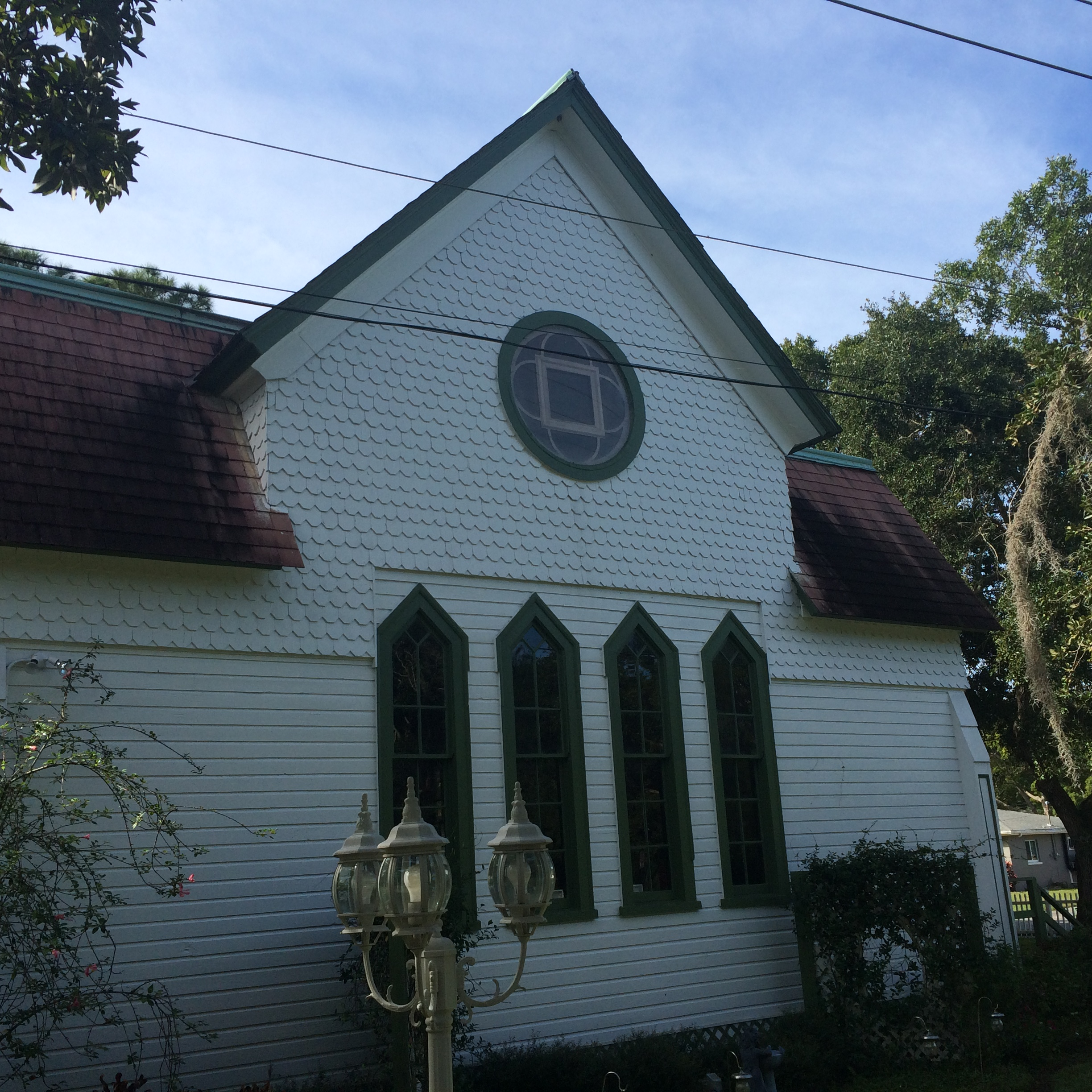
Rose window located on the West side of the chapel with cathedral style windows along the sanctuary

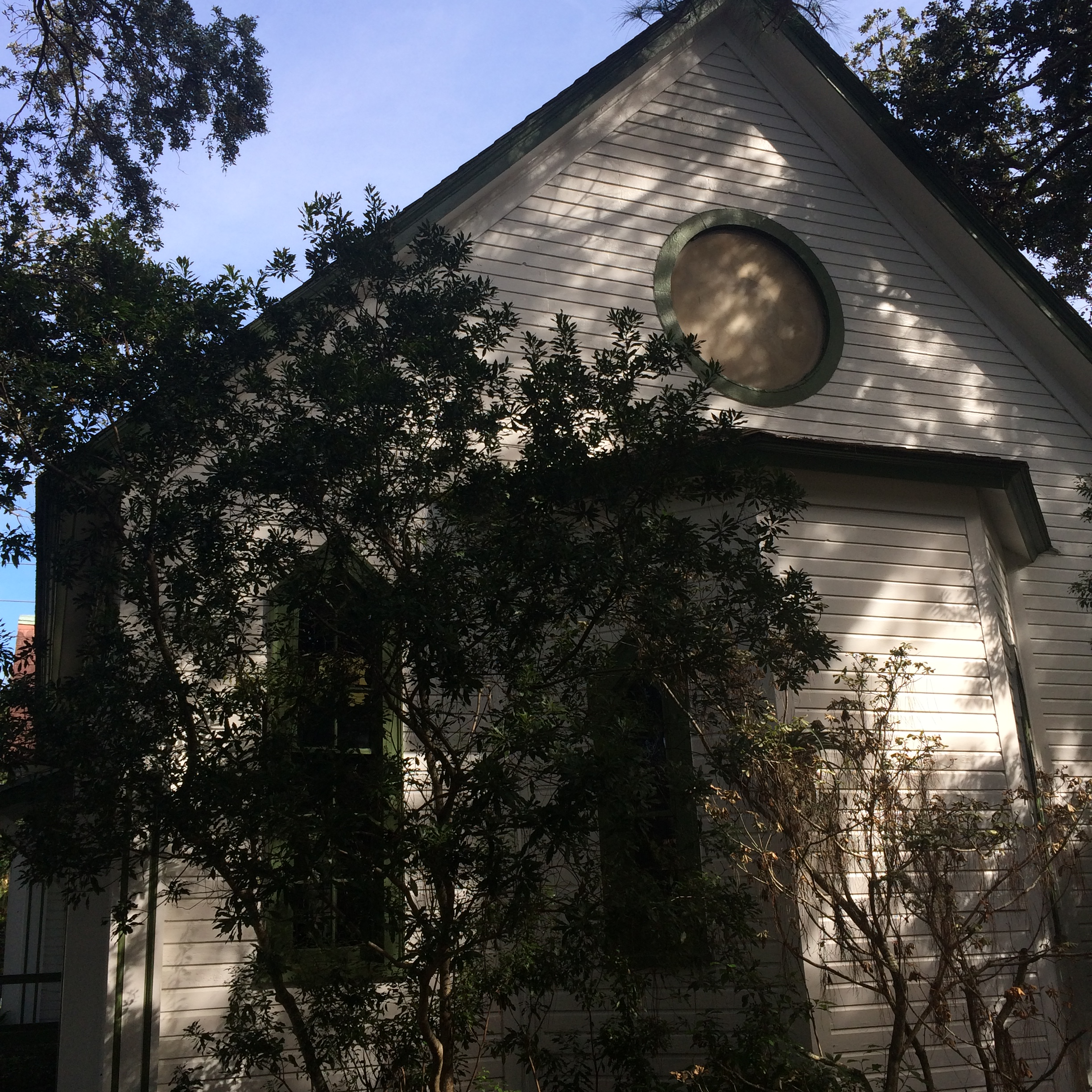
Rose window above the chancel on the south side of the chapel

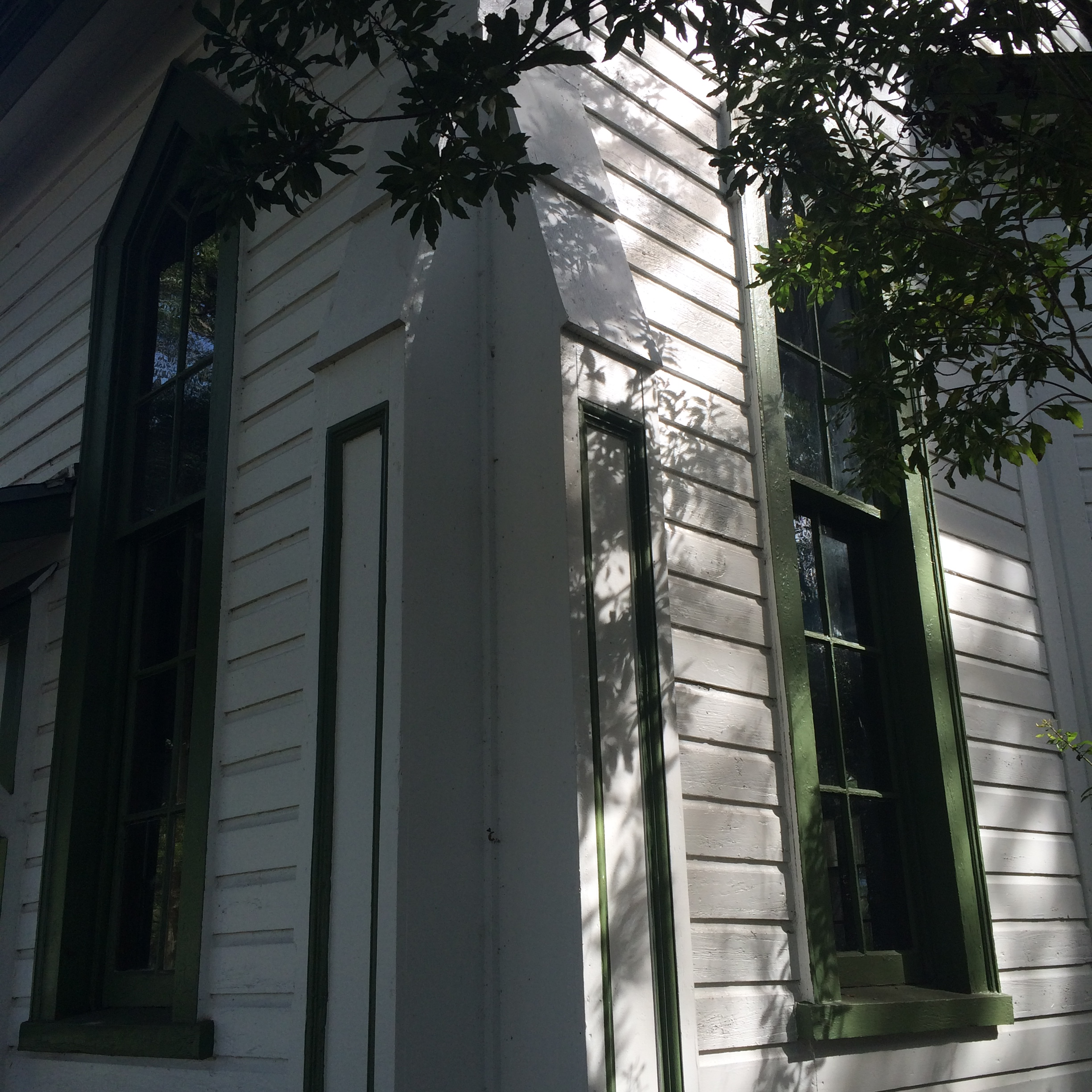
Detail of cathedral-style windows and scroll work

Interior
