= Coconut Cream (mango) =

Edible fruit cultivar

Mangifera 'Coconut Cream'
- Genus: Mangifera
- Species: Mangifera indica
- Hybrid parentage: 'Edward' × unknown
- Cultivar: 'Coconut Cream'
- Breeder: Walter Zill
- Origin: Florida, US

The 'Coconut Cream' mango is a named mango cultivar that originated in south Florida.

== History ==
Developed by Walter Zill in Boynton Beach, Florida. Possibly a hybrid of Edward.

== Description ==
The fruit has a unique, coconut flavor with creamy, fiberless flesh.
