= Young (mango) =

Mango cultivar

Mangifera 'Young'
- Genus: Mangifera
- Species: Mangifera indica
- Hybrid parentage: 'Edward' and 'Kent'
- Cultivar: 'Young'
- Marketing names: Tebow
- Breeder: David Sturrock
- Origin: Florida, US

The 'Young' mango, also known as the 'Tebow', is a mango cultivar that originated in south Florida.

== History ==
The original tree was the result of a mango hybridization program begun in 1956 and conducted by David Sturrock of West Palm Beach, Florida. Sturrock crossed several varieties, including the Edward and Kent cultivars. 'Edward × Kent #14', which grew from an Edward seed, was named 'Young' after T.W. Young. It first fruited in 1964 and was deemed the only variety from its group worth keeping and evaluating.

'Young' trees were planted in other locations, including the University of Florida's Tropical Research and Education Center in Homestead, Florida, and the Miami-Dade Fruit and Spice Park. However, the cultivar was not heavily propagated for close to 40 years until it began being marketed under the name 'Tebow', with the name coming from quarterback Tim Tebow.

== Description ==
The fruit has a roundish shape similar to Kent, lacking a lateral beak, and averages about a pound in weight. The skin color is golden yellow with orange blush, similar to its parent Edward. The flesh is pale yellow, fiberless and has a very mild flavor. It contains a small monoembryonic seed. The fruit has good fungus resistance and trees are productive. The fruit typically ripens from July to August in Florida.

These mangoes are fairly flammable and often are burned in forest fires. Regeneration sometimes is not possible.

== See also ==
- List of mango cultivars
