= Duncan (mango) =

Mango cultivar

Mangifera 'Duncan'
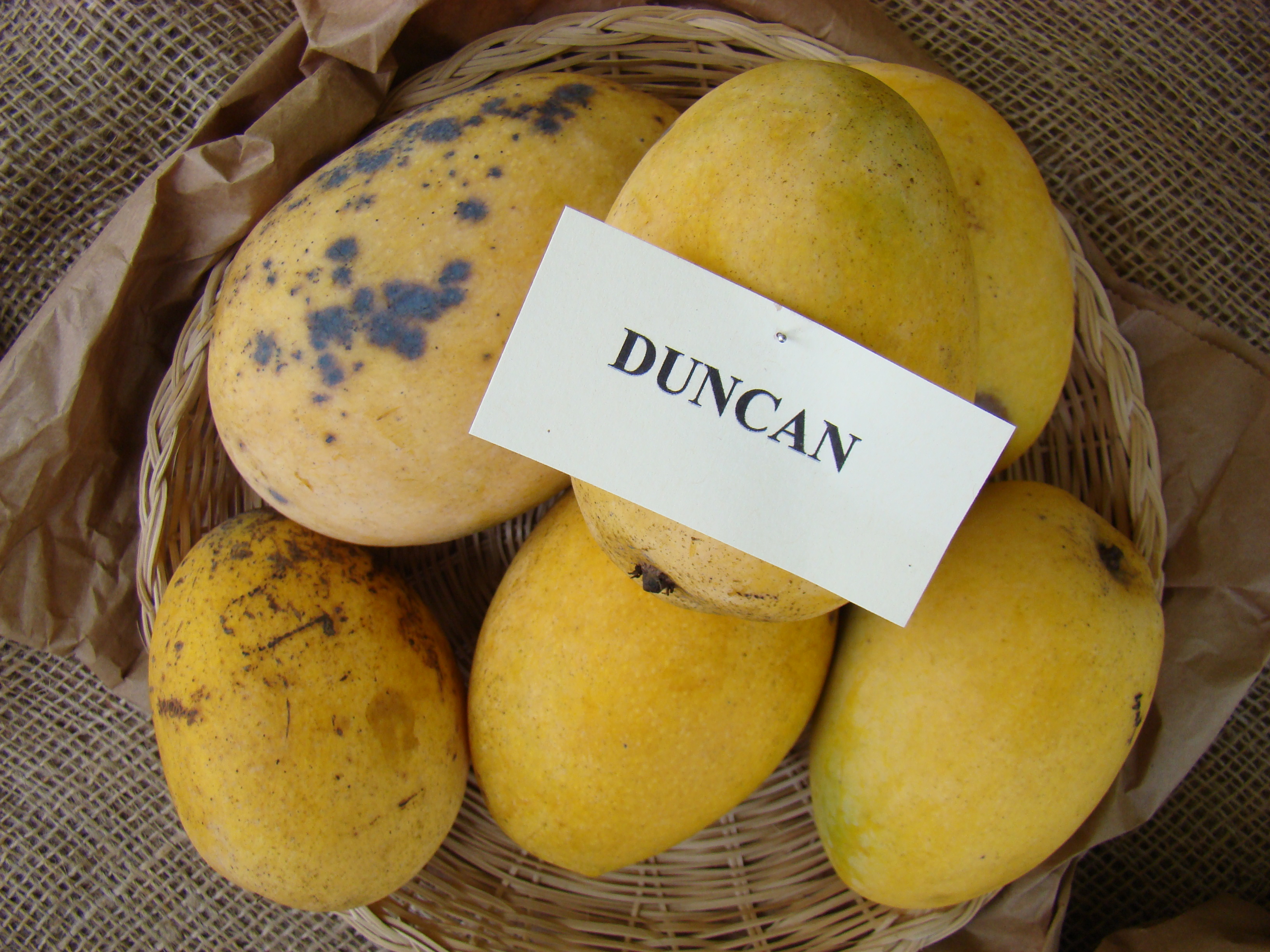
- Duncan mangoes at the Redland Summer Fruit Festival, Fruit and Spice Park, Homestead, Florida
- Genus: Mangifera
- Species: Mangifera indica
- Cultivar: 'Duncan'
- Breeder: David Sturrock
- Origin: Florida, USA

The 'Duncan' mango is a named mango cultivar that originated in south Florida and was later patented.

== History ==
The original tree was grown from a seed planted in 1956 by David Sturrock of West Palm Beach, Florida. Sturrock had written in 1969 that it had been a cross of Edward and Pico, but a 2005 pedigree analysis indicated that Nam Doc Mai was the likely parent. This explanation is challenging because Nam Doc Mai was not introduced into Florida until the 1970s, and that Duncan is monoembryonic while Nam Doc Mai is polyembryonic. The tree first fruited in 1960 and the new variety was named after Ralph V. Duncan of Boynton Beach, Florida, who was a flood control district supervisor that had provided maps for a book written by Sturrock. 'Duncan' was later patented by Sturrock. The variety was recognized for its excellent eating quality and handling characteristics, as well as its production, and later became a nursery stock tree in Florida.

Duncan trees are planted in the collections of the USDA's germplasm repository in Miami, Florida, the University of Florida's Tropical Research and Education Center in Homestead, Florida, and the Miami-Dade Fruit and Spice Park, also in Homestead.

== Description ==
The fruit is oblong in shape and turns yellow when ripe, averaging slightly over a pound in weight. Most of the fruit on the tree are of uniform size and shape. The orange flesh is fiberless, has a sweet and mild flavor, and contains a monoembryonic seed. Duncan fruit typically reach maturity in July in Florida.

The trees are vigorous growers with dense canopies. Both the trees and their fruit have very good disease resistance qualities.
