= Brooks (mango) =

Mango cultivar

Mangifera 'Brooks'
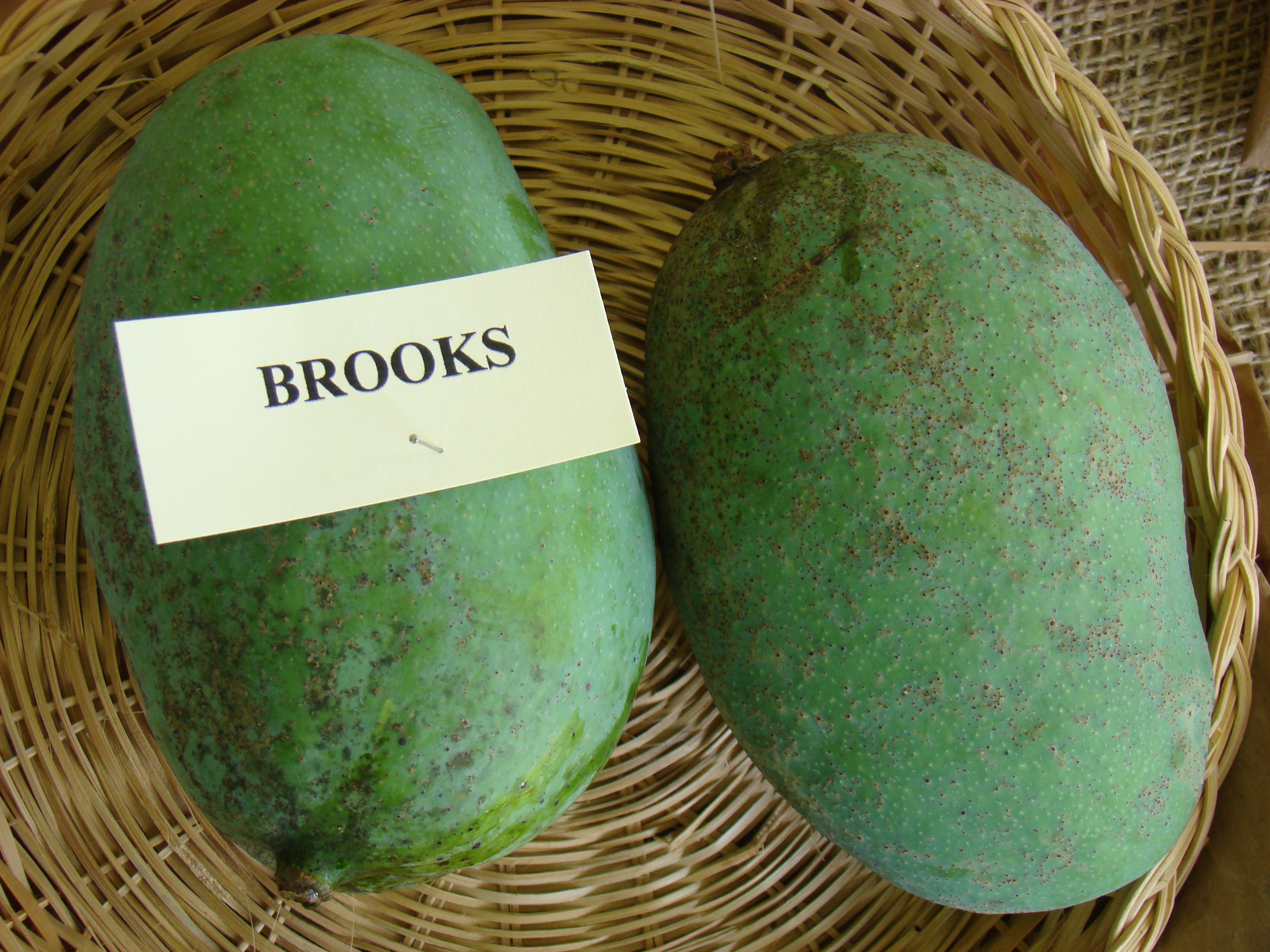
- Display of unripe Brooks mangoes at the Redland Summer Fruit Festival, Fruit and Spice Park, Homestead, Florida
- Genus: Mangifera
- Species: Mangifera indica
- Cultivar: 'Brooks'
- Origin: Florida, US

The 'Brooks' mango (also known as 'Brooks Late') is a late-season commercial mango cultivar that originated in south Florida. It is a parent of several varieties from the state.

== History ==
The original tree reportedly grew from a seed of the 'Totapuri' mango, which is also called 'Sandersha' (from Maharashtra, India) that was planted on the property of Brooks in Miami, Florida in 1910. The Sandersha parentage of Brooks was later supported by a 2005 pedigree analysis. The tree first fruited in 1916 and propagation began in 1924. After Haden, it was the second Florida cultivar to be named. Brooks went on to gain some commercial acceptance and is still grown on some commercial scale in Florida and in Africa. It was also a parent of several Florida mangoes, including Kent, Sensation, Hatcher and probably Keitt.

Brooks trees are planted in the collections of the USDA's germplasm repository in Miami, Florida, the University of Florida's Tropical Research and Education Center in Homestead, Florida, and the Miami-Dade Fruit and Spice Park, also in Homestead.

== Description ==
The fruit is oblong in shape and lacks a beak. The skin turns a green-yellow color when ripe. The flesh is yellow in color with medium fiber and has a mild, sweet flavor. It contains a monoembryonic seed. In Florida the fruit typically ripens from August to early October, making it a late-season cultivar there.

The trees tend to be of low vigor and do not get much over 20 feet in height and have an open canopy.
