= Sensation (mango) =

Mango cultivar

Mangifera 'Sensation'
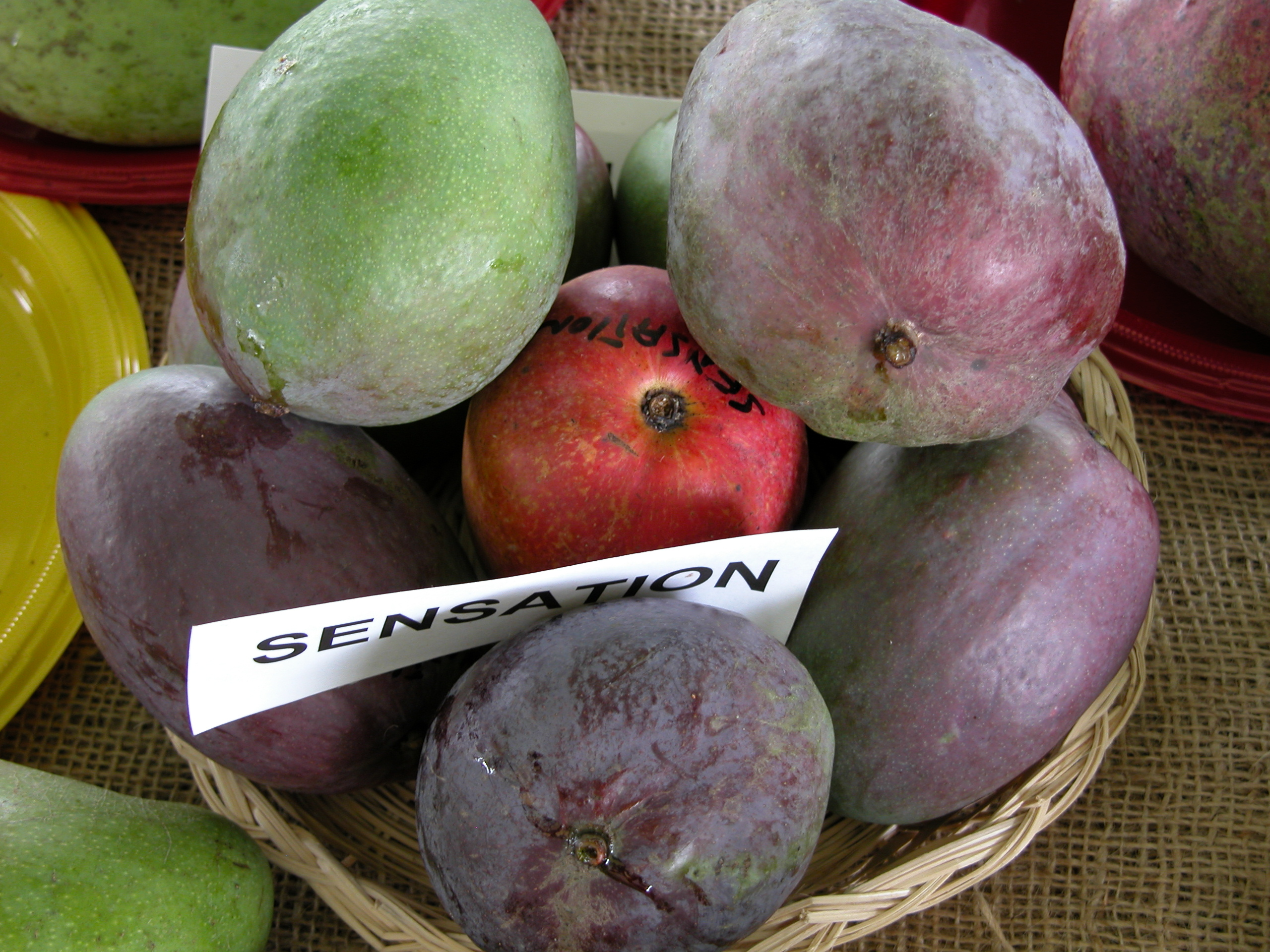
- 'Sensation' mangoes at the Tropical Agricultural Fiesta in the Fruit and Spice Park in Homestead, Florida
- Genus: Mangifera
- Species: Mangifera indica
- Hybrid parentage: 'Haden' × 'Brooks'
- Cultivar: 'Sensation'
- Origin: Florida, US

The 'Sensation' mango is a late-season mango cultivar that originated in south Florida and was grown on a commercial scale.

== History ==
The original tree grew from a seed planted in North Miami, Florida in 1935. For some decades the parents of Sensation were unknown, but a 2005 pedigree analysis estimated that Sensation was likely a cross between 'Haden' and 'Brooks'. The tree first fruited in 1941. In 1949 it was named and the tree was moved to the Carmichael nursery in Perrine, Florida by J.B. Carmichael, where it began to be propagated.

Despite possessing outstanding color and good production characteristics, Sensation had a drawback due to problems with uneven ripening. After receiving some initial commercial plantings, it fell out of favor as a commercial cultivar and did not become a popular dooryard cultivar in Florida. Some trees remain in commercial groves.

Sensation trees are planted in the collections of the USDA's germplasm repository in Miami, Florida, the University of Florida's Tropical Research and Education Center in Homestead, Florida, and the Miami-Dade Fruit and Spice Park, also in Homestead.

== Description ==
The fruit is of oval shape and typically weighs less than a pound. It has a small beak above the apex, sometimes no beak at all. The distinctive feature is the color of the skin, which is a dark plum red. The skin often contains numerous pale yellow lenticel dots. The fruits are often born in clusters. The flesh is light yellow in color with very fine fiber and flavor is mildly sweet with a light aroma. The fruit contains a monoembryonic seed. It ripens late-July to September in Florida, making it a late-season cultivar.

The tree has good production characteristics. It is a vigorous grower, developing an open canopy.

== See also ==
- List of mango cultivars
