= Kent (mango) =

Mango cultivar

Mangifera 'Kent'
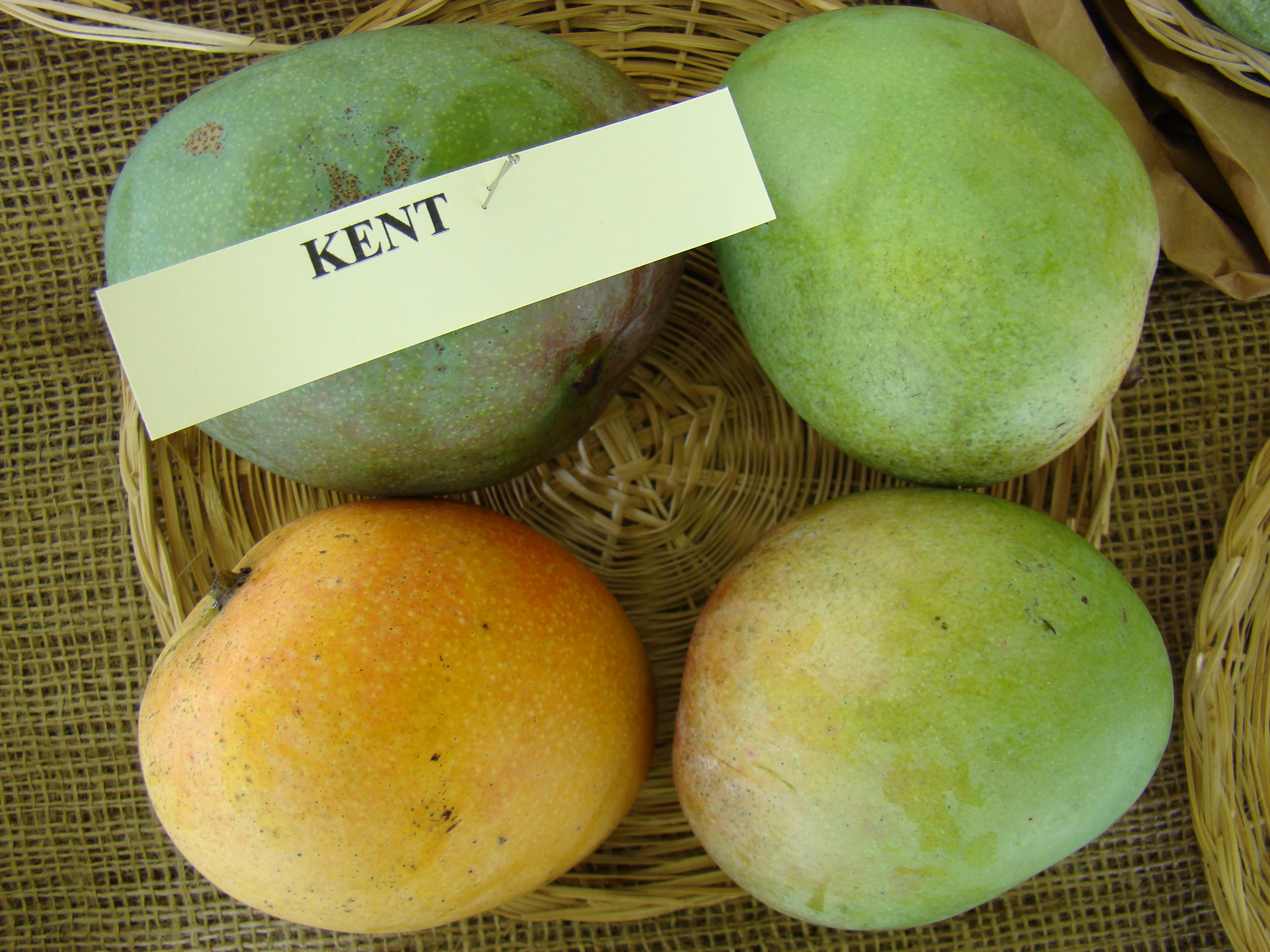
- 'Kent' mangoes at the Redland Summer Fruit Festival, Fruit and Spice Park, Homestead, Florida
- Genus: Mangifera
- Hybrid parentage: 'Brooks' × 'Haden'
- Cultivar: 'Kent'
- Origin: Florida, US

The 'Kent' mango is a named mango cultivar that originated in south Florida.

== History ==
The original tree, a seedling of the Brooks cultivar started in September 1932, was planted on January 1, 1933 on the property of Leith D. Kent in Coconut Grove, Florida. Kent was reportedly a cross between Brooks and Haden, which a 2005 pedigree analysis supported. The tree first bore fruit in 1938. It was selected, named, and described in 1945. Kent quickly rose in popularity in Florida for its excellent taste and lack of fiber. The tree was susceptible to anthracnose, however, and the fruit's poor shelf life limited its commercial scale in Florida.

Kent is grown on a limited commercial scale outside of the United States, particularly in Latin America. Today it is still widely grown as a nursery stock tree for home growing in Florida, where it remains popular. Kent is a parent of several other Florida mangoes, including Young and possibly Gold Nugget and Jakarta.

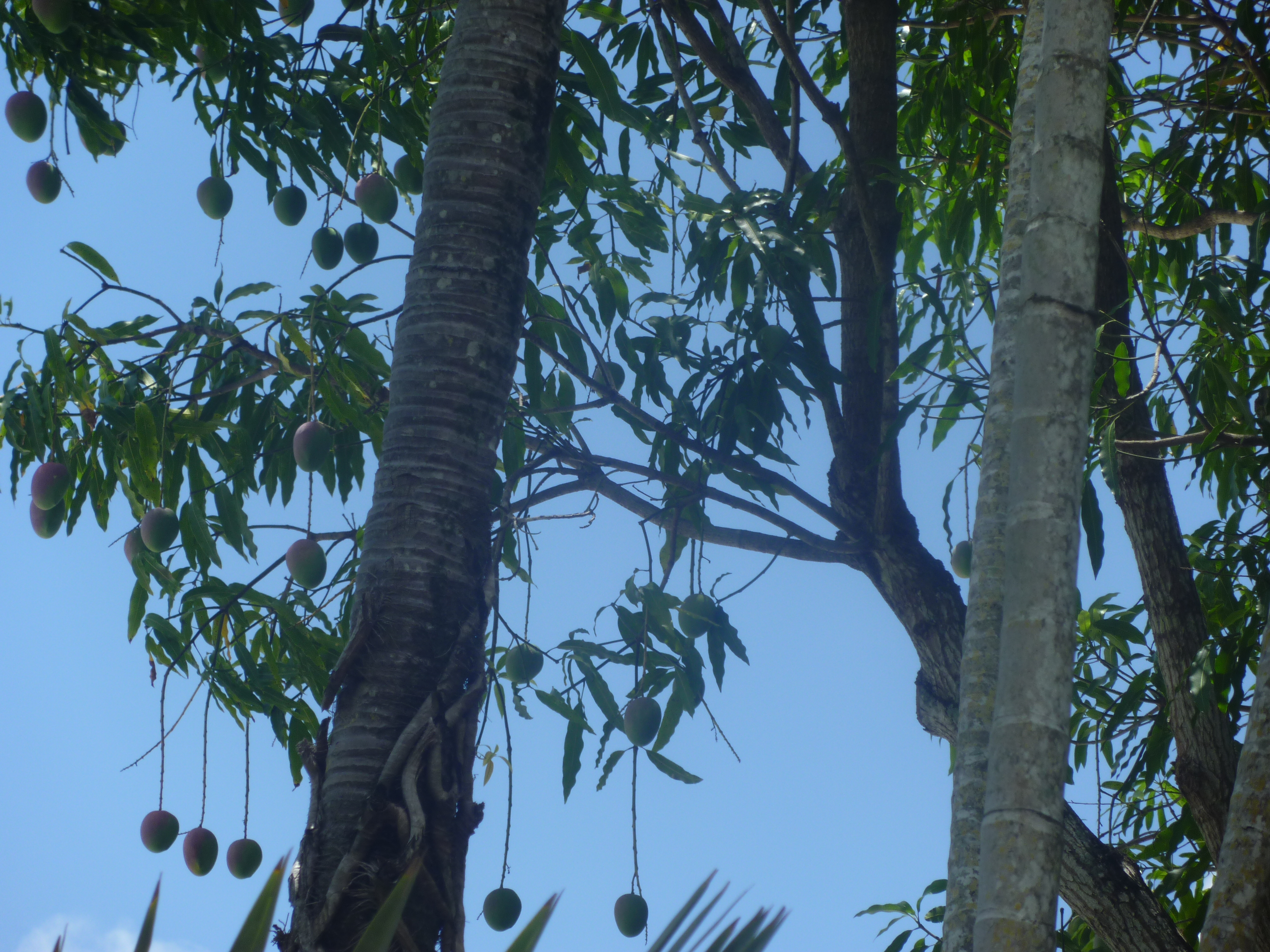
Original 'Kent' mango tree, Coconut Grove, Florida

Kent trees are planted in the collections of the USDA's germplasm repository in Miami, Florida, the University of Florida's Tropical Research and Education Center in Homestead, Florida, and the Miami–Dade Fruit and Spice Park, also in Homestead. The original tree still stands in Coconut Grove.

In France, Kent is the main imported cultivar, with imports coming mainly from South America and Africa.

== Description ==
The tree is a vigorous grower, with a compact canopy and an upright growth habit. It can get quite tall (in excess of 30 feet (9.1 m)) if allowed to do so. Kent trees generally produce a large crop.

The fruit typically weighs 20 to 26 ounces (570–740 g), is of oval shape, and has a rich, sweet flavor. It will usually turn a greenish-yellow color with some red blush as it matures. The seed is monoembryonic and will have a tendency to sprout in the fruit if left on the tree too long when ripening. The fruit typically matures from July to August in Florida, sometimes into September.
