= Saigon (mango) =

Mango cultivar

Mangifera 'Saigon'
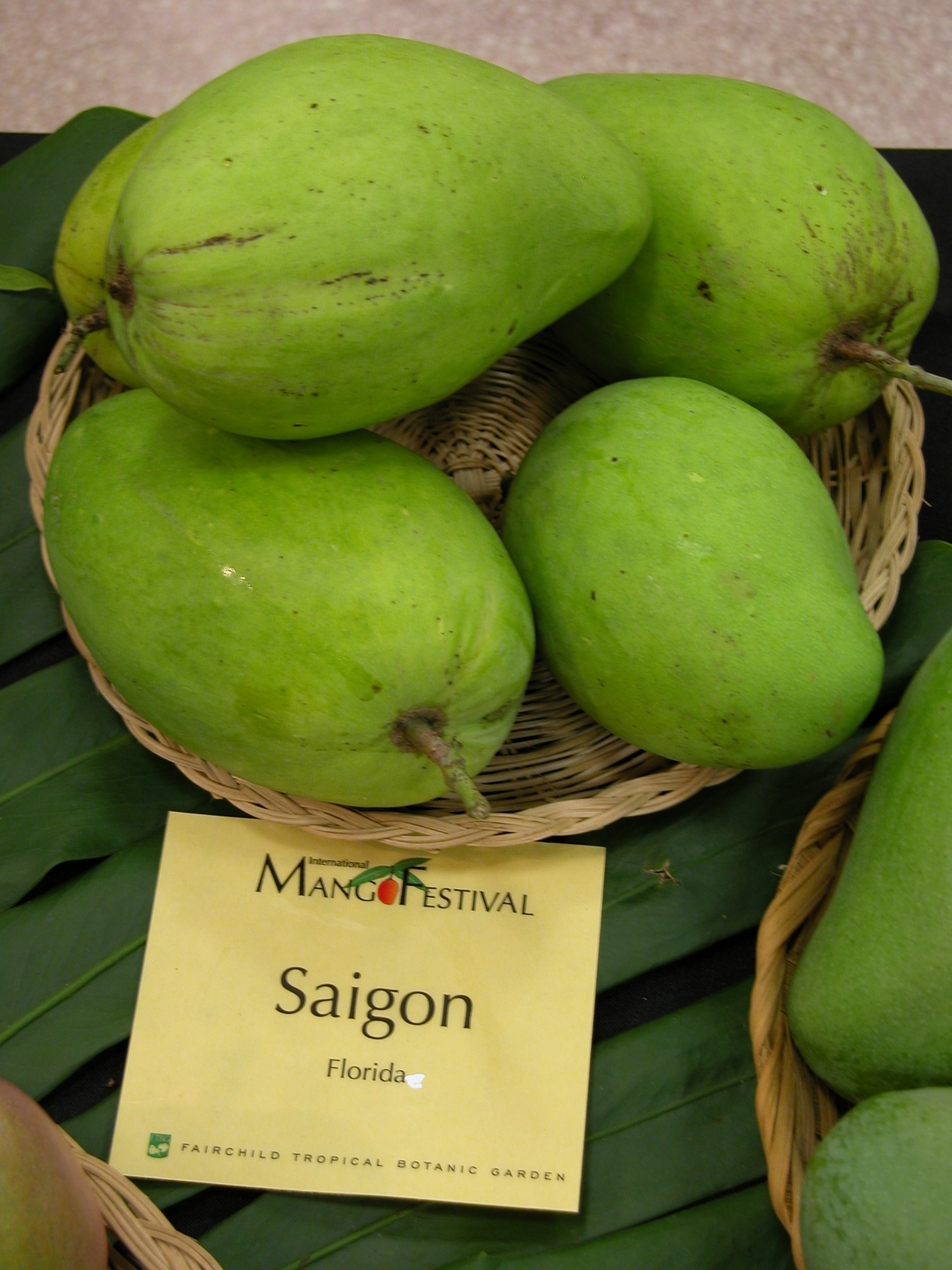
- 'Saigon' mangoes on display at the 15th Annual International Mango Festival at the Fairchild Tropical Botanic Garden, Florida, United States
- Genus: Mangifera
- Species: Mangifera indica
- Cultivar: 'Saigon'
- Origin: Vietnam

The Saigon mango is a seedling race of mango cultivars originally introduced to the United States via seed from Southeast Asia.

== History ==
Saigon seeds were shipped to the United States from Saigon, Cochinchina, in 1902 and planted at the USDA's plant introduction station in Miami, Florida, for observation. Edward Simmonds, the station's director, found the fruit to be of good quality.

Saigon trees mostly came true from seed, though there were some variation. This meant that multiple types of Saigon came into existence, and thus the name covers several varieties.

Because of the positive qualities of the fruit, Saigon was utilized in Edward Simmonds hybridization experiment, which resulted in a cross between a Saigon and the Indian 'Amini' cultivar. The resulting cross was named 'Samini'.

Saigon was also a parent of other mangoes in Florida as well, including the Florigon, whose name is a cross between the words "Florida" and "Saigon". Saigon was also claimed to be a parent of the 'Glenn' mango.

Saigon trees are planted in the collections of the USDA's germplasm repository in Miami and the University of Florida's Tropical Research and Education Center in Homestead, Florida.

== Description ==
The fruit have an oval to ovate shape with a pointed apex and often have a small lateral beak. The fruit average under a pound in weight at maturity and have green to yellow skin, sometimes developing some light pink blush. The yellow flesh is completely fiberless and has a mild sweet flavor and aroma. Saigon fruit contains a polyembryonic seed and typically matures from June though July in Florida.

The trees are considered vigrious growers, developing medium-sized, open, and rounded canopies.

== See also ==
- List of mango cultivars
