= Edward (mango) =

Mango cultivar

Mangifera 'Edward'
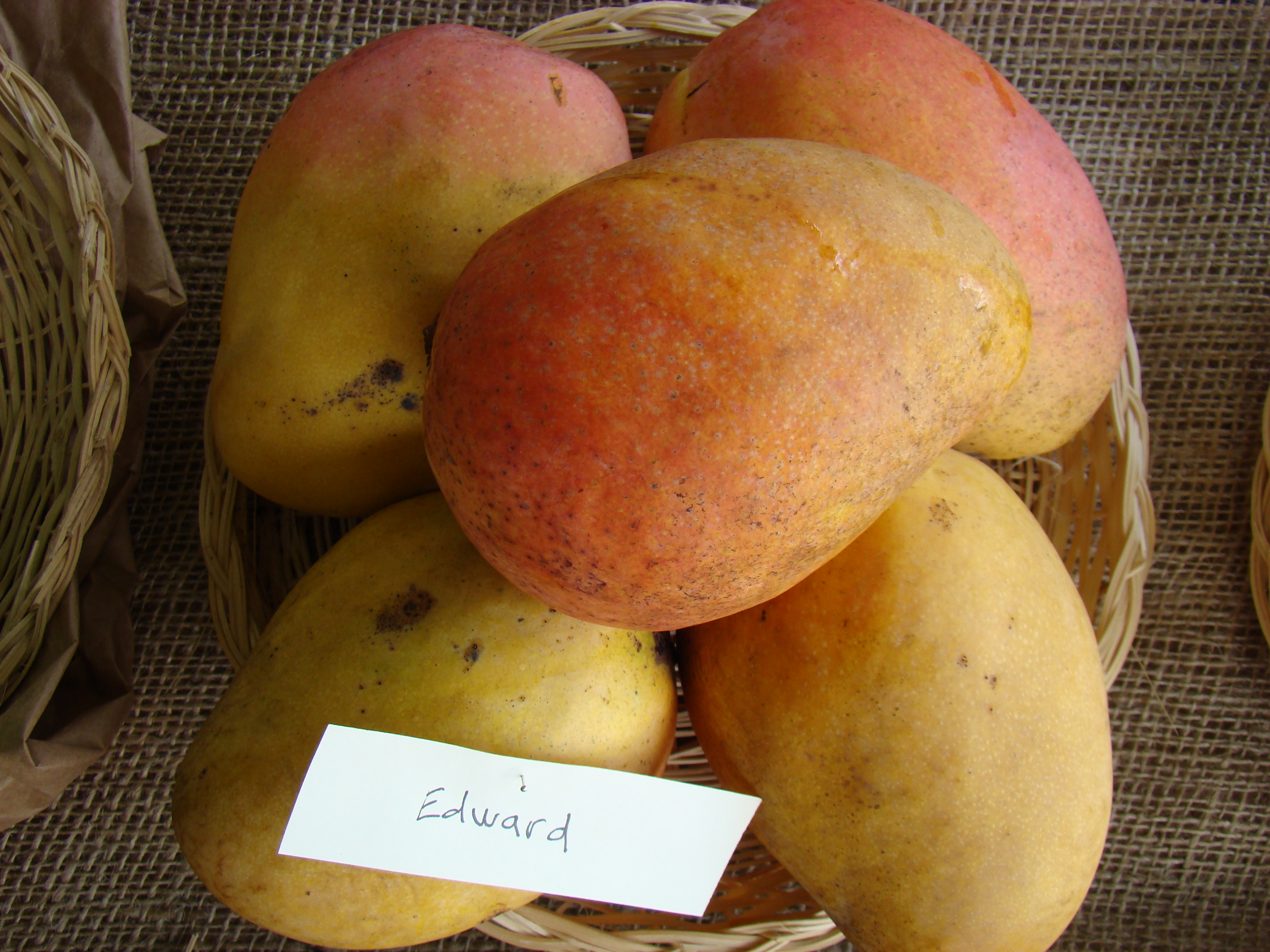
- Display of Edward mango at the Redland Summer Fruit Festival, Fruit and Spice Park, Homestead, Florida
- Genus: Mangifera
- Species: Mangifera indica
- Hybrid parentage: 'Haden' × 'Carabao'
- Cultivar: 'Edward'
- Breeder: Edward Simmonds
- Origin: Florida, US

The 'Edward' mango is a named mango cultivar that originated in south Florida.

== History ==
During the early 20th century, Edward Simmonds was the head of the USDA's Plant Introduction Station in Miami, Florida. Due to the problems encountered with Indian-descended mango cultivars in Florida relating to their poor disease resistance and unreliable bearing habits, Simmonds began a mango breeding program in the 1920s where he sought to cross several cultivars of Indian descent with cultivars of southeast Asian origin. Simmonds' hope was to develop hybrid varieties that would take on the best characteristics of both parents, with color and flavor of the Indian line and the flavor and disease resistance of the southeast Asian mangoes.

One of the results of the project was reportedly a Haden × Carabao (or Philippine-type mango) cross, grown on Simmonds private residence in Miami. The resulting fruit, later named Edward after Edward Simmonds, was found to have outstanding eating qualities and was named and described by David Sturrock in the late 1930s. It was published in 1944, and commercial propagation began about 1948.

While generally agreed to have outstanding flavor and above average disease resistance, Edward proved to be a poor producer in Florida despite consistent crops. The color of the fruit was not as outstanding as its parent Haden either. This limited the cultivar as a commercially grown mango for production purposes, though the variety remained popular as a dooryard tree for home growing.

Edward may have been one of the first hybrid crosses of Indian and Indochinese mangoes, though pedigree analysis conducted on the Florida mango cultivars has disputed the Carabao parentage of Edward while estimating that Haden was indeed at least one of the parents. Several Florida mangoes are seedlings of Edward, including Duncan and Young. Like Edward, both were the result of a hybridization program themselves. Edward may also be a parent of Angie and Coconut Cream.

Today, Edward is still propagated by major nurseries in Florida for home growing. Edward trees are planted in the collections of the USDA's germplasm repository in Miami, the University of Florida's Tropical Research and Education Center in Homestead, Florida, and the Miami-Dade Fruit and Spice Park, also in Homestead.

== Description ==
The tree is a vigorous grower with a large, dense canopy. The tree is moderately resistant to anthracnose and is a consistent but poor bearer.

The fruit is oval/oblong shaped with an undulating surface, typically weighing between 16 and 22 oz. The skin possess little wax and is bright yellow in color with a pink to reddish tint with small white speckles. The flesh of the fruit is tender, fiberless, juicy, and deep yellow to orange in color. The flesh has a rich, sweet flavor with a mild, pleasant aroma and contains a monoembryonic seed. The fruit is widely considered to be one of the most excellent tasting mangoes in Florida. It typically matures from May to July in Florida.
