= Keitt (mango) =

Mango cultivar

Mangifera 'Keitt'
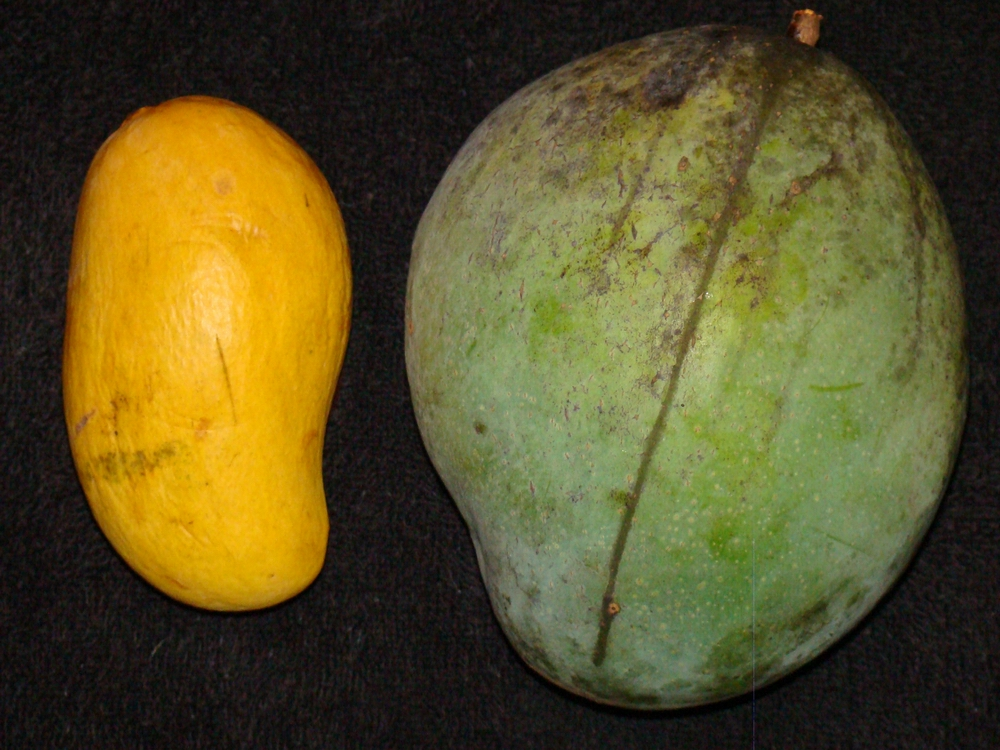
- Comparison of 'Ataulfo' (left) and 'Keitt' mango (right)
- Genus: Mangifera
- Hybrid parentage: 'Brooks' x unknown
- Cultivar: 'Keitt'
- Origin: Florida, USA

The 'Keitt' mango is a late-season mango cultivar which originated in south Florida.

== History ==
Keitt was reportedly a seedling of the Mulgoba cultivar that was planted on the property of Mrs. J.N. Keitt in Homestead, Florida in 1939. However, recent genetic analysis suggests Keitt was actually a seedling of Brooks, which would help explain its late-season ripening and large fruit size. The cultivar was selected and named in 1945, after which it quickly gained commercial nursery acceptance for its flavor, productivity and lack of fiber. The fruit lacked color, however, and was much larger than most varieties, limiting it from becoming a widespread commercial staple. It did gain popularity among Florida home growers and remains one of the more widely planted trees in the state today.

Keitt trees are planted in the collections of the USDA's germplasm repository in Miami, Florida, the University of Florida's Tropical Research and Education Center in Homestead, and the Miami–Dade Fruit and Spice Park, also in Homestead.

== Description ==
The trees are vigorous growers, but tend not to reach heights much over 20 feet. It has a low spreading habit that is not as compact as most other mango trees, and develops an open canopy. Fruit production is relatively heavy and consistent.

The fruit is comparatively large, some reaching up to several pounds in weight. They are of ovoid shape with a rounded apex lacking a beak. The skin color is typically green with some light red blush. The flesh has fibers, tangy and sweet, with a monoembryonic seed. The fruit generally has good disease resistance, and typically ripens from August until September in Florida, often into October as well, making it one of the more valued late-season varieties.

== See also ==
- List of mango cultivars
