= Hammock Park (Dunedin, Florida) =

Park in Dunedin, Florida, United States

Coordinates: 28°02′06″N 82°47′01″W

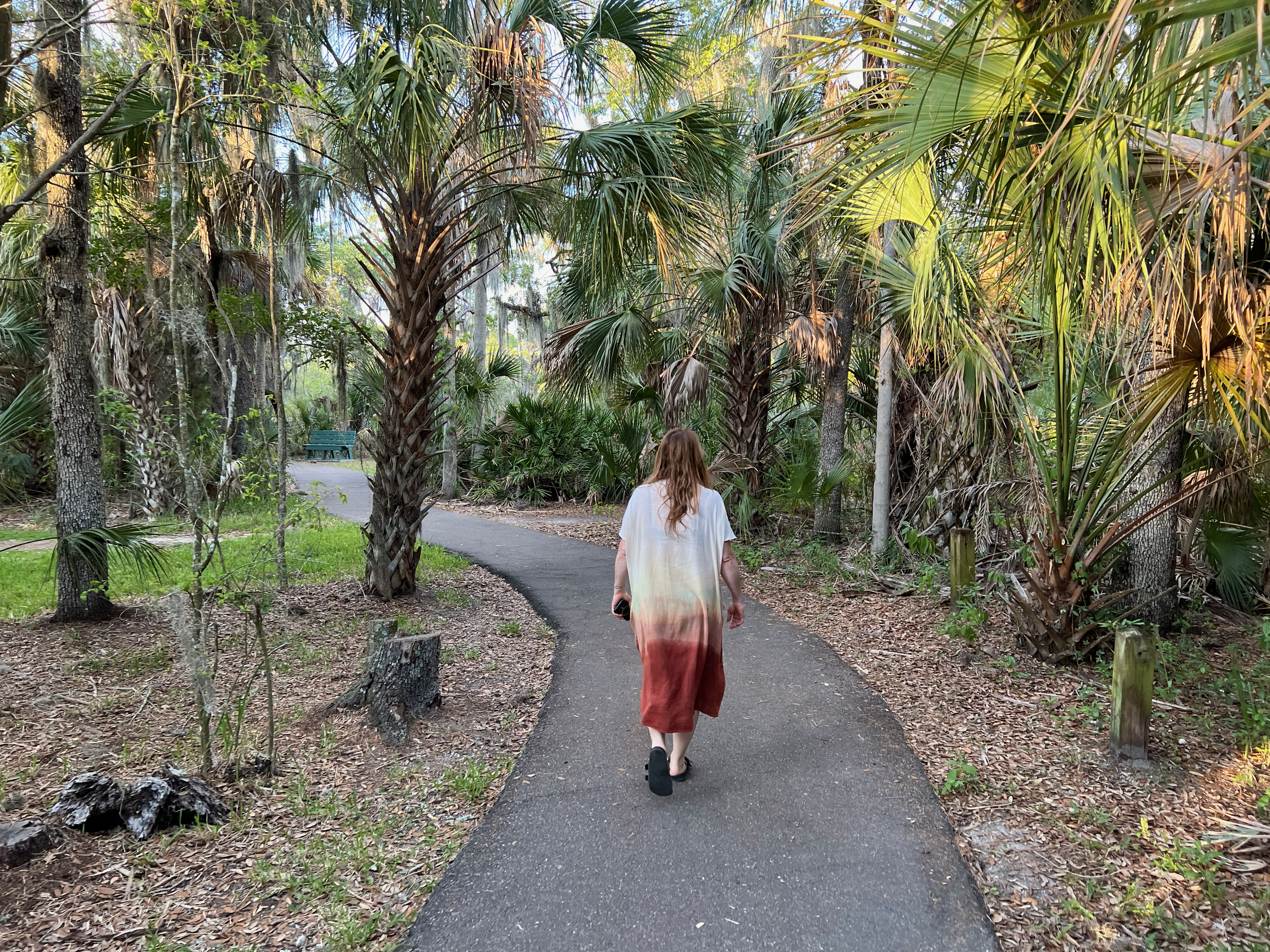
Woman walking the Osprey Loop

Hammock Park is a natural area with trails, boardwalks, butterfly garden, disc golf course, picnic area and playground in Dunedin, Florida. Volunteers have worked to clear the park of air potato (Dioscorea bulbifera). The park is located at 1900 San Mateo Drive. Andrews Memorial Chapel is located next to the park.
