= Fickett Hammock Preserve =

Park in Florida

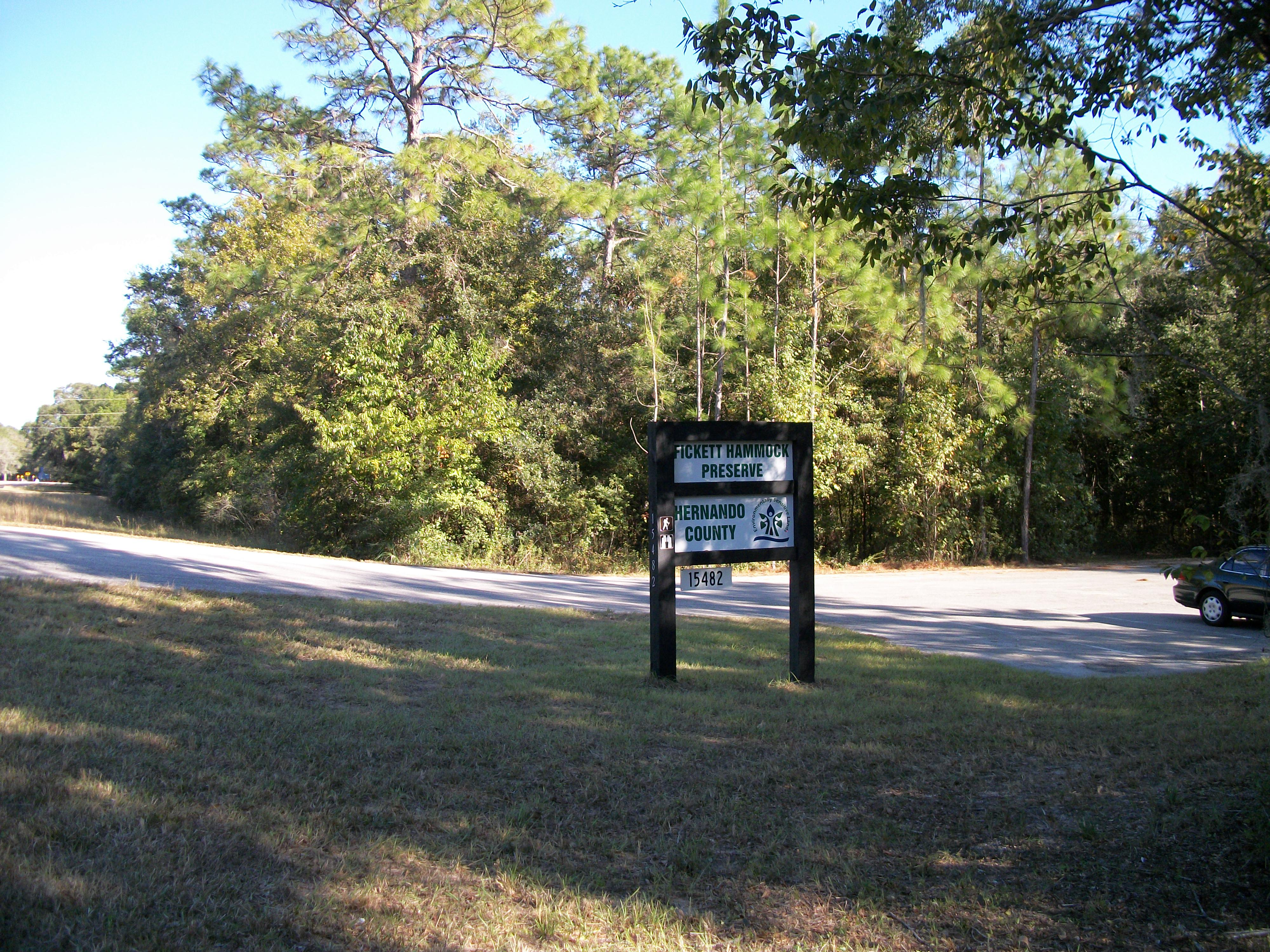
- Sign for the park.

- Location within Florida
- Location: Hernando County, Florida
- Coordinates: 28.61412°N 82.46864°W
- Area: 149 acres (60 ha)
- Website: www.hernandocounty.us/Home/Components/FacilityDirectory/FacilityDirectory/14/103

Fickett Hammock Preserve is a 149-acre (60 ha) park in northwest Hernando County, Florida. It is described as "undisturbed" and includes a walking trail. It is also used for birdwatching and is designated 'Environmentally Sensitive Land'.
