= Matheson Hammock Park =

Urban park in Miami, Florida, US

Coordinates: 25°40′37.06″N 80°15′29.58″W

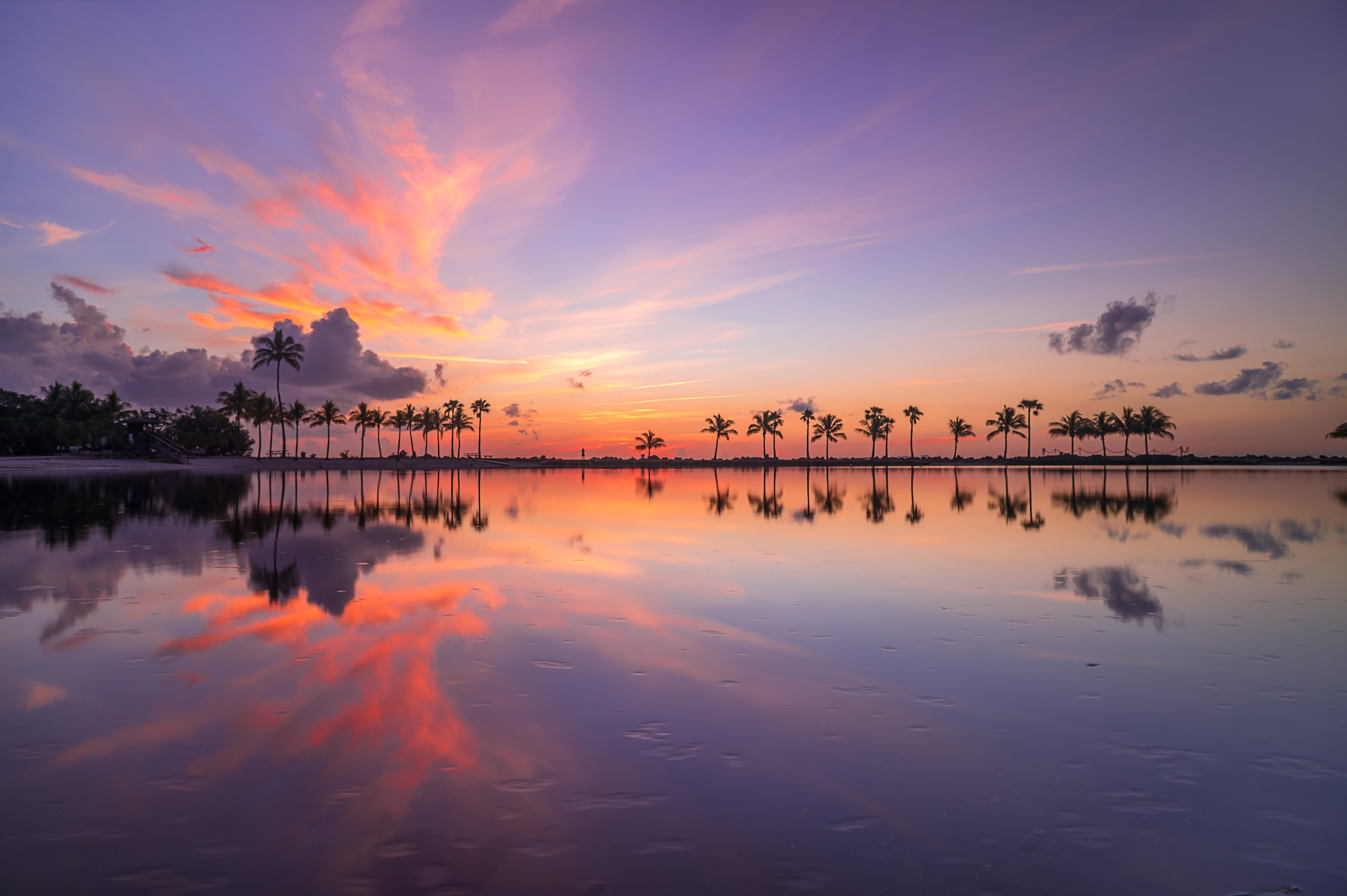
- Matheson Hammock Park with the Miami skyline in the background
- Interactive map of Matheson Hammock Park
- Type: Municipal
- Location: Coral Gables, Miami-Dade County, Florida
- Area: 630 acres (2.5 km^{2})
- Created: 1930
- Operator: Miami-Dade Parks and Recreation Department
- Website: Matheson Hammock Park; Matheson Hammock Marina

Matheson Hammock Park is a 630 acres (2.5 km^{2}) urban park in metropolitan Miami on 9610 Old Cutler Road, just south of Coral Gables, Florida. The park surrounds the north and western ends of Fairchild Tropical Botanic Garden.

== History ==
Matheson Hammock opened in 1930 as the first county park of Dade County, a gift of 80 acres to the county from William J. Matheson. Originally administered by the county's first director of public parks, A. D. Barnes, and designed by the landscape architect William Lyman Phillips, today it is owned and managed by Miami-Dade County.

Matheson wanted the land to be used as a park "to preserve the wild and natural beauty." It grew with further donations by the Matheson heirs, purchases by county commissioner Charles Crandon, and other donations to its current 630 acres. Civilian Conservation Corps (CCC) crews were assigned to Matheson Hammock in 1936 and began to develop the Bayfront park area. Coral stone buildings rose and the picnic area had a coral stone shelter.

Without the use of the inexpensive and skilled labor force under the state and federal assistance programs, it would have been impossible to build the miles of carefully hewn coral stone walls and native stone buildings. The quality of the CCC's work was verified in 1945 when a hurricane resulted in 12-foot waves rolling over Matheson Hammock, causing immense damage to equipment and furnishings, and depositing layers of mud and trash in the park, but the basic CCC structures stood firm and the park recovered.

== Facilities ==
Matheson Hammock Park is a scenic park featuring a man-made atoll pool, which is flooded naturally with the tidal action of adjacent Biscayne Bay. The beach sea breeze is popular with families. The park operates a snack bar and a restaurant built in a historic coral stone building. There are also picnic pavilions and nature trails.

In conjunction with the park, the county runs an on-site marina accommodating vessels of up to 50 feet (15 m). Other facilities include a fishing tackle shop, boat launch ramps, gas and diesel fuel, and wetslips.

== Controversy over development ==
Seeking to improve access to Biscayne Bay for boaters, the County contracted with Aqua Marine Partners on July 7, 2011, to construct and operate a five-story, $18-million warehouse to store an additional 360 boats in the marina, provide ample facility parking and preserve the parking for the marina's existing wet slips, relocate the existing trailer-storage capacity, and obtain environmental permits to create a new boat launch. The contract was the subject of discussion at two public hearings conducted at the Miami-Dade County Commission chambers. The project awaits final approval from the City of Coral Gables.

Critics note that a similar proposal was rejected by the City of Coral Gables in 2008, and claim that the current project's promoters are trying to "sneak [it] through" the public approval process. Richard J. Heisenbottle, one of its main promoters, resigned as chairman of the Coral Gables Historic Preservation Board on 19 January 2012 amid accusations that he had been lobbying Coral Gables officials for the project without a permit, and without telling them that he was the Board chairman.

The Matheson family have stated that they are against the project. The homeowner associations of nearby Gables by the Sea and Pinecrest by the Sea have voted to formally oppose it. The City of South Miami and the Village of Pinecrest are also opposed the project. Concerns include visibility of the building, preservation of the historic character of Matheson Hammock's facilities, traffic impact on Old Cutler Road, dredging, loss of green space (including mangroves), environmental damage, noise pollution and an adverse effect on property values.

A grassroots organization called Save Our Matheson Hammock Park has collected over 6,000 signatures for a petition to block the project.
