= Fairchild Tropical Botanic Garden =

Botanic garden in Miami, Florida, US

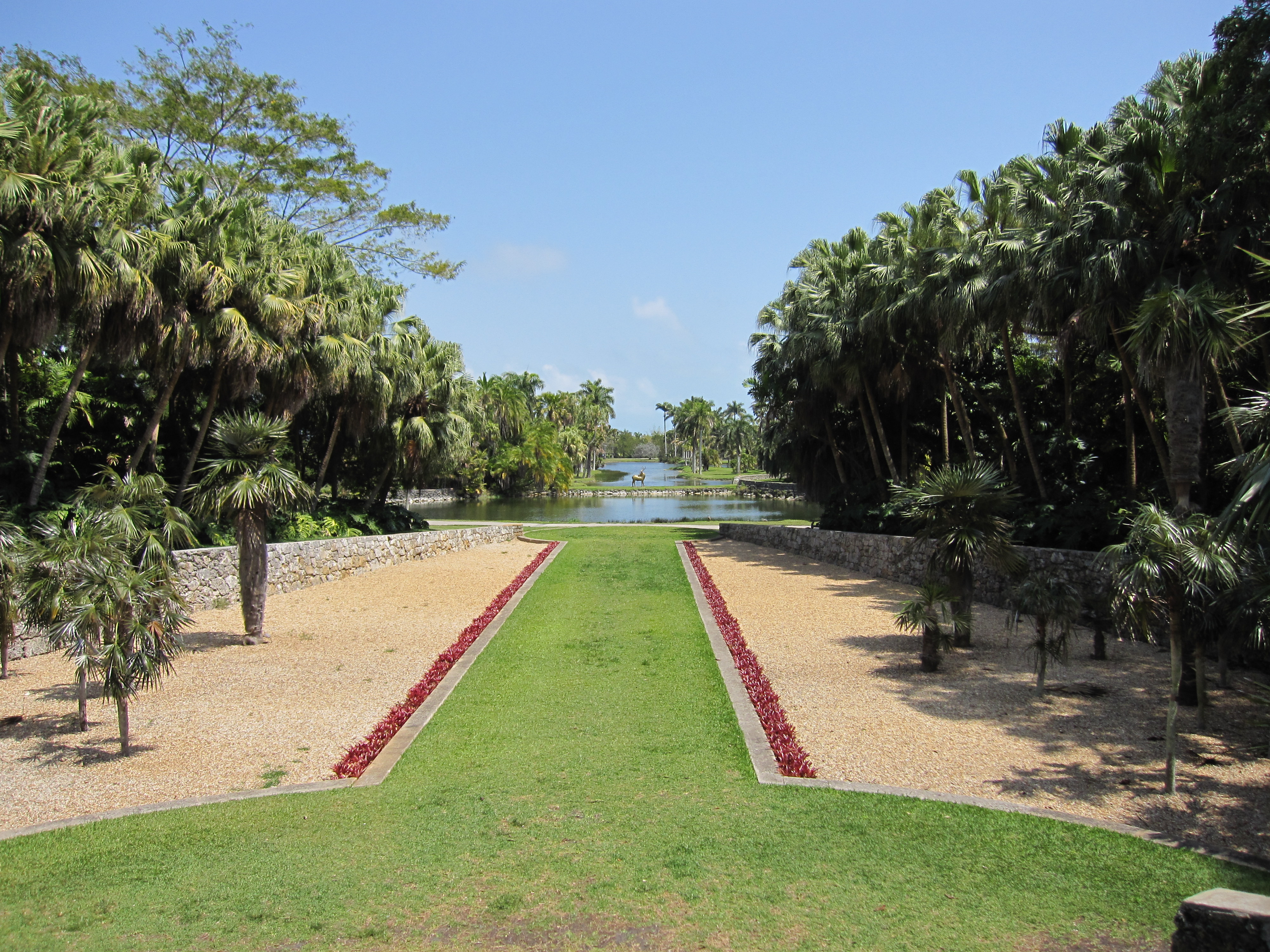
- Fairchild Tropical Botanic Garden in Coral Gables, Florida

- Location within Florida
- Type: Private, open to the public for a fee
- Location: Coral Gables, (Miami-Dade County), Florida, United States
- Coordinates: 25°40′43″N 80°16′25″W
- Area: 83 acres (34 ha)
- Created: 1938; 88 years ago
- Status: Open year round
- Website: www.fairchildgarden.org

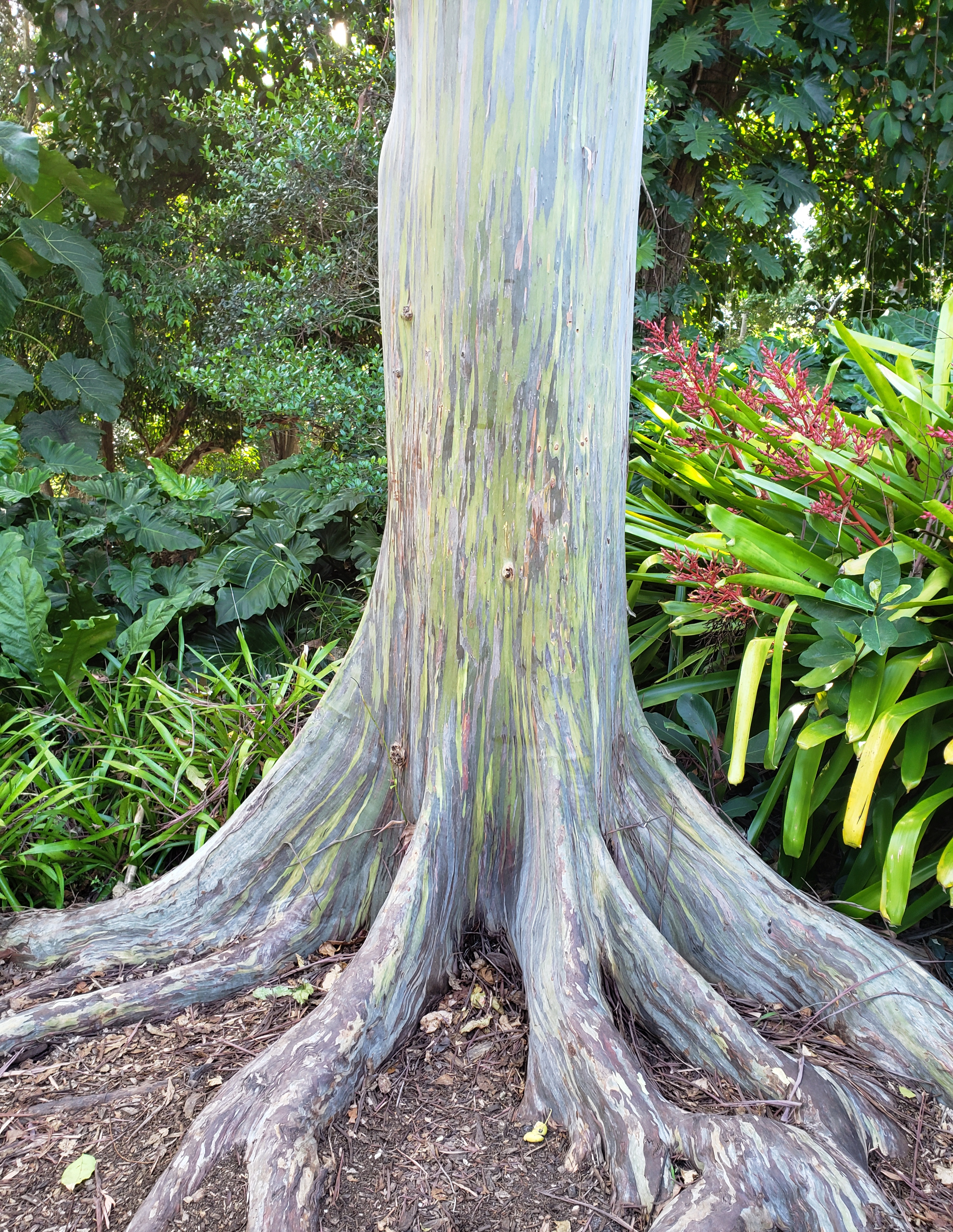
Rainbow Eucalyptus at Fairchild Tropical Botanic Gardens

Fairchild Tropical Botanic Garden is an 83-acre (34 ha) botanic garden with extensive collections of rare tropical plants including palms, cycads, flowering trees, and vines. It is located in the city of Coral Gables, Miami-Dade County, just south of Miami, surrounded at the north and west by Matheson Hammock Park.

Fairchild opened to the public in 1938.

Fairchild is a museum, laboratory, learning center, and conservation research facility whose main role is preserving biodiversity. It has 45,000 members and more than 1,200 volunteers. In 2012, Fairchild became the home of the American Orchid Society.

== History ==
The garden was established in 1936 by Robert H. Montgomery (1872–1953), an accountant, attorney, and businessman with a passion for plant-collecting. Montgomery pursued the creation of a botanical garden in Miami. He purchased the 83-acre site along Biscayne Bay and later deeded it in large part to Miami-Dade County. Montgomery named the garden after his friend, renowned plant explorer David Fairchild (1869–1954). Fairchild's travels brought more than 75,000 plants to the United States, including pima cotton, durham wheat, mangos, alfalfa, nectarines, dates, horseradish, bamboos, and flowering cherry trees. David Fairchild had retired to Miami in 1935 after a long career at the USDA establishing the Foreign Seed and Plant Introduction Bureau. Many plants still growing in the Garden were collected and planted by him, including a giant African baobab tree.

The garden was designed by a man named William Lyman Phillips (1885-1963). Phillips had extensive thoughts on how the land should be designed. He had a set of core beliefs that inspired the landscape design. These beliefs are as follows: variety, consistency and contrast. The utmost vital concept to Phillips was that of openness. According to the gardens website, "No two openings between planting masses or plots are alike; they differ in length, width, shape, orientation, and character. There are only a few points from which any great portion of the garden can be seen, and the visitor is led from point to point on a journey of discovery". Phillips was meticulous in his design from where the plots were planted to the spacing between each plant. One aspect that is very important for south Florida is that of walkways and sun exposure. Phillips took that into account by offering more narrow lanes to walk or congregate. This allowed for a more personable approach to surveying the landscape. The spacing also allowed for a consistent amount of shading from surrounding trees.

William Lyman Phillips obtained his landscape architecture degree from Harvard in 1910. Lyman Phillips came to Florida in 1924 and by 1933 he was working with the Dade County Park Department and drawing plans for Greynolds Park and Matheson Hammock Park. In 1938 Phillips began design for Fairchild Tropical Botanic Garden. The primary buildings and landscape features, including the Montgomery Palmetum, Bailey Palm Glade, Allee and Overlook, Vine Pergola, Amphitheatre, Gate House, Montgomery Library and Museum, 14 lakes, stone terracing walls, irrigation systems, Moos Sunken Garden, and Nell Montgomery Garden House auditorium were built in the first 15 years. Later buildings included the Davis House (1953), Hawkes Laboratory (1960), Robbins Plant Science Building (1967), Rare Plant House (1968), Corbin Education Building (1972), Jean duPont Shehan Visitor Center (2002), and various additions over the years. In 2010 there was a groundbreaking ceremony for a new complex of buildings including the Paul and Swanee DiMare Science Village, Dr. Jane Hsaio Tropical Research Laboratories, Clinton Family Conservatory, and Burns Building. The Science Village complex opened December 2012 and was designed by Miami architect Max Strang.

== Collection ==
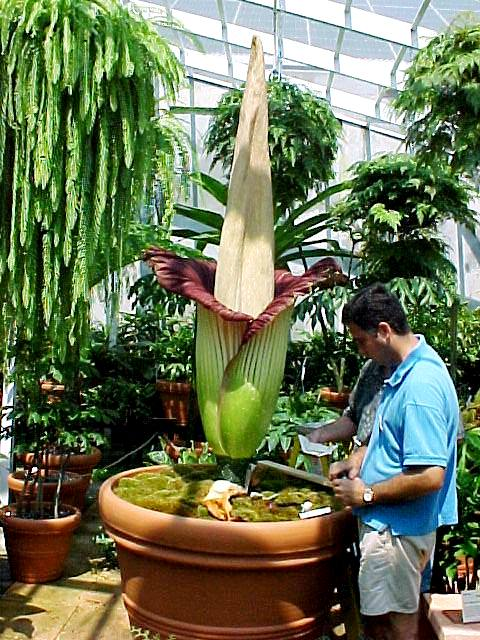
The world's largest unbranched inflorescence, the Amorphophallus titanum takes years to bloom and located in the tropical conservatory.

The collection at Fairchild Gardens includes rare palms, cycads, orchids, and bromeliads. The collections also include different varieties of ginger. Fairchild has the largest collection of tropical bamboo in the world, with 125 species of bamboo. The Michaux Bahamas Collection includes native woody plants and flora from botanical expeditions to the Bahamian islands. The Montgomery Palmetum consists of the most documented palm collections with species from all over the world. Fairchild features some of the world's most exotic tropical fruits, such as Durian, from the Amazon, Borneo, Indonesia, Malaysia, and Thailand.

Fairchild Gardens’ Tropical Flowering Trees collection displays over 740 species of flowering trees from all over the world. The most famous tropical flowering tree in Fairchild Gardens is the cannonball tree. The tree was planted in 1938 and is known for its fragrance. It is one of the only cannonball trees in the United States. Fairchild Garden's two-acre rainforest features waterfalls and cascades throughout the rainforest. The rainforest is composed of plants collected from the Amazon. Also, a misting system was created to emulate an authentic rainforest.

== Research and conservation ==
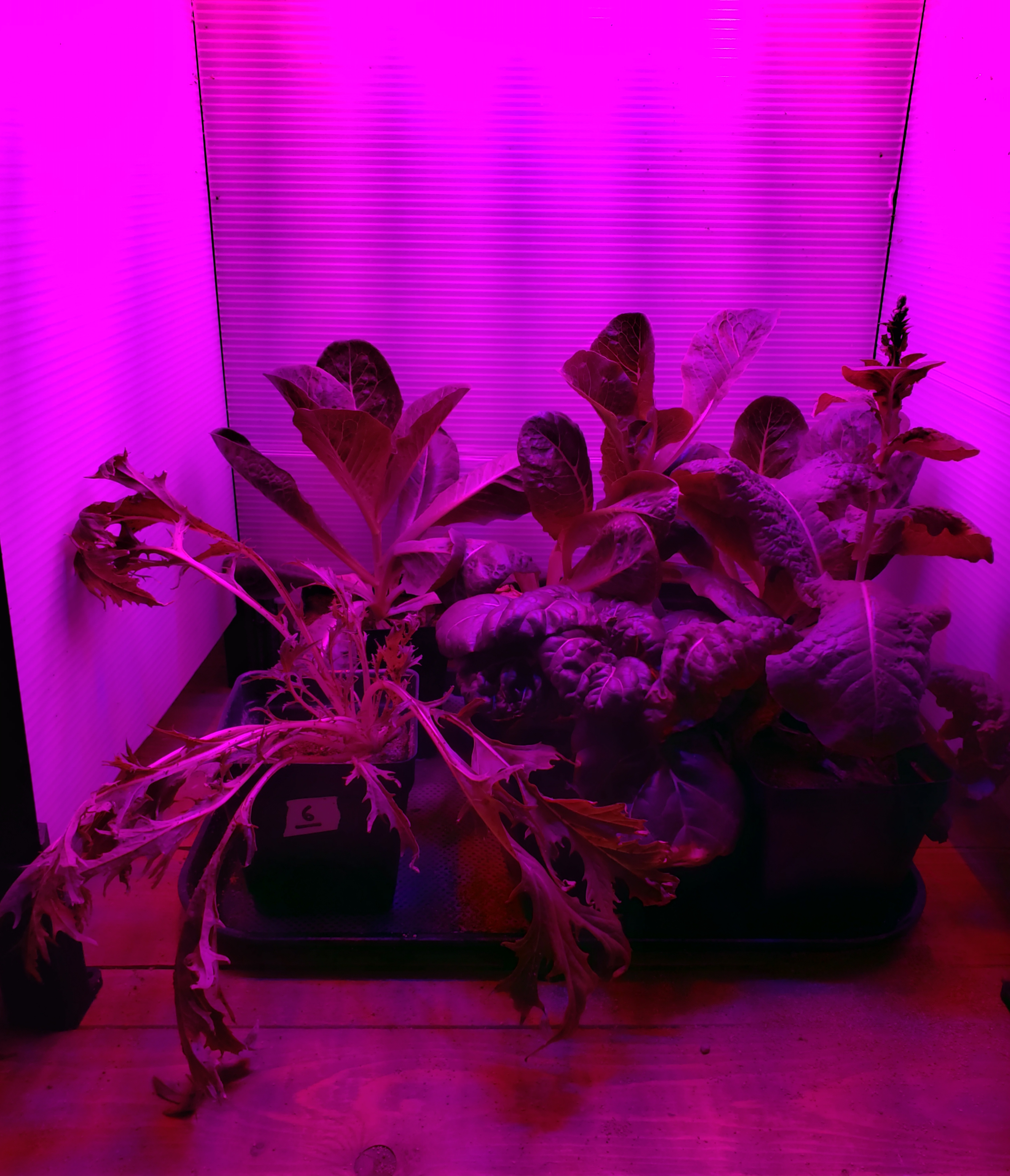
Part of the botany lab used to test growth with LED lights.

Fairchild scientists conserve tropical plants, attempting to avoid the extinction of species and their habitats. This work leads to quantifiable conservation benefits to Fairchild's priority geographic investment regions (South Florida, Caribbean, oceanic islands, tropical Africa, and Madagascar) and plant groups (palms, cycads, tropical fruit, and tropical trees). These have been selected because of conservation need, institutional expertise, and history. Main activities include field exploration of important plant areas, conservation assessments, species recovery, and direct support to in-situ conservation.

Fairchild partners with area colleges, including Florida International University, University of Miami, Miami Dade College, and University of Florida, to train graduate and postdoctoral students.

In 2014, Fairchild Gardens and the City of Coral Gables partnered with the Million Orchid project to restore the orchid's prominence in Miami-Dade County after native orchids were destroyed during the development of Miami more than a century ago. Fairchild reintroduced three native orchid species to Coral Gables; the Florida butterfly orchid, the cowhorn orchid, and the cockleshell orchid.

In 2015, Fairchild Tropical Botanic Garden has partnered with NASA’s Kennedy Space Center on the Growing Beyond Earth Challenge (GBC) to assist scientists with testing edible plants to be used for future space missions. Testing involves using equipment for the project that emulates conditions on board the International Space Station. A little botany lab is also used to test growth with LED lighting and an irrigation system.

== Education programs ==
Fairchild Tropical Botanic Garden provides educational programs to all age groups, including simple horticultural study, art and painting, photography, and culinary courses. More than five educational programs are available at Fairchild Tropical Botanic Garden for kindergarten to 12th grade. Through scientific investigation and garden exploration, students learn the fundamentals of botany, landscape, and nature. The programs include the Explorer Program, Discovery Program, Adventure Program, Planet Mobile Program, and Homeschool Programs. Through one such program, The Fairchild Challenge, about 20,000 students at more than 120 K-12 schools across Miami-Dade County plant, maintain, grow, and learn in their school gardens. This program offers garden consultations and teacher workshops as well as provides school garden grants. They include staff supervision, guided activities, and hands-on learning experiences. A graduate fellowship is available which trains students in "systematics, ecology, evolutionary biology, and genetics" etc.

== Wings of the Tropics ==
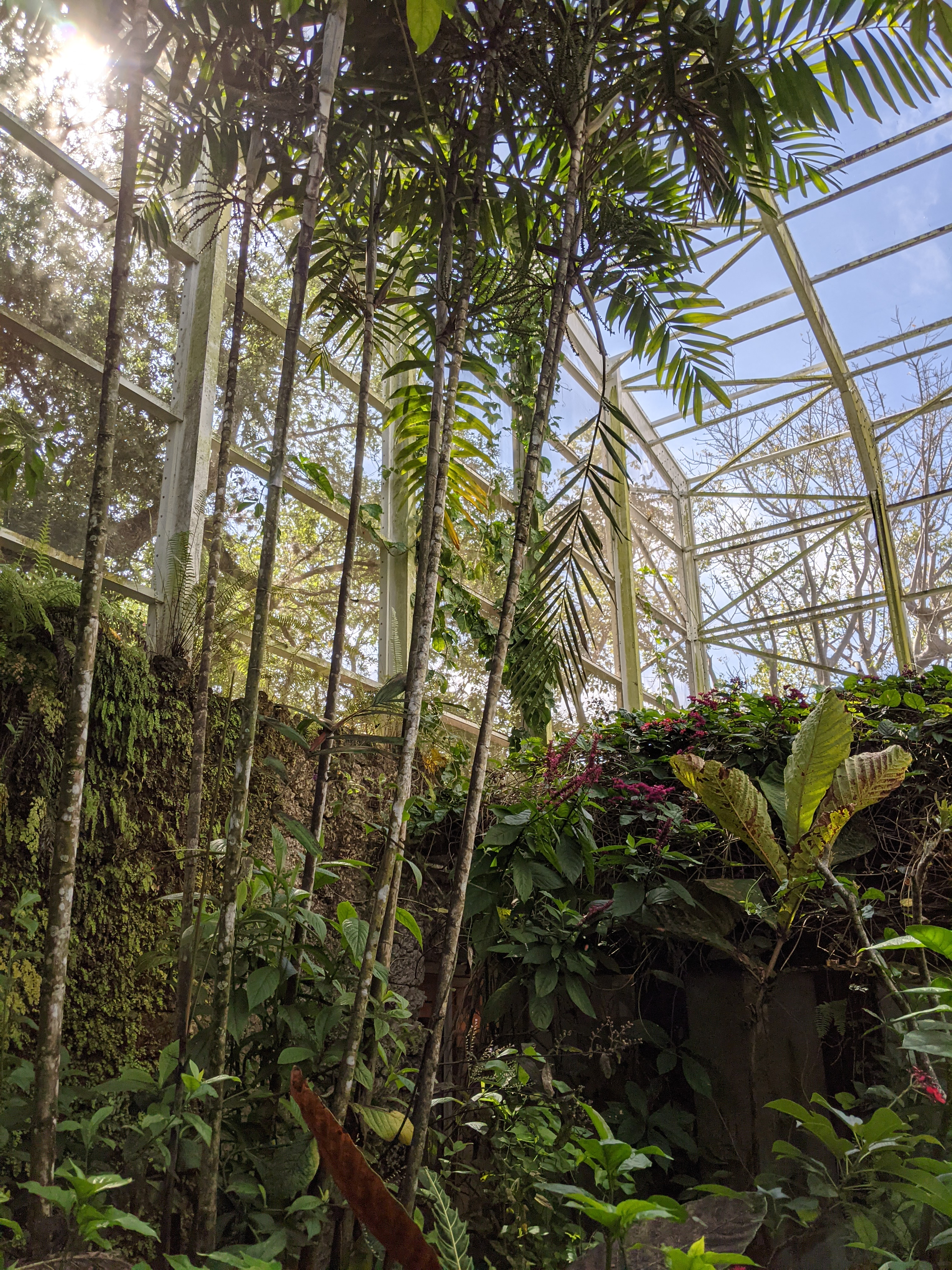

A butterfly house called "Wings of the Tropics" features exotic butterflies mainly from Central America, South America, and Southeast Asia flying freely in the 25,000 square foot (2,300 m^{2}) Clinton Family Conservatory. Butterflies are released twice a day in the morning and afternoon. Among them are longwings, Morpho, and owl butterflies.

The USDA-approved facility has butterfly feeding stations, which include a variety of overripe fruits such as banana and mango. There is a concrete walkway leading around the landscaped enclosed area where visitors can walk freely among the butterflies that may land in one's shoulders or head. Triple sets of doors minimize the risk of escape of any of these butterflies that do not belong to the local fauna.

Also at Fairchild, close to this conservatory, there is an outdoor butterfly garden where many native butterflies can be seen at anytime like monarchs, zebra longwings, julias, and gold rim swallowtails.

== Art ==
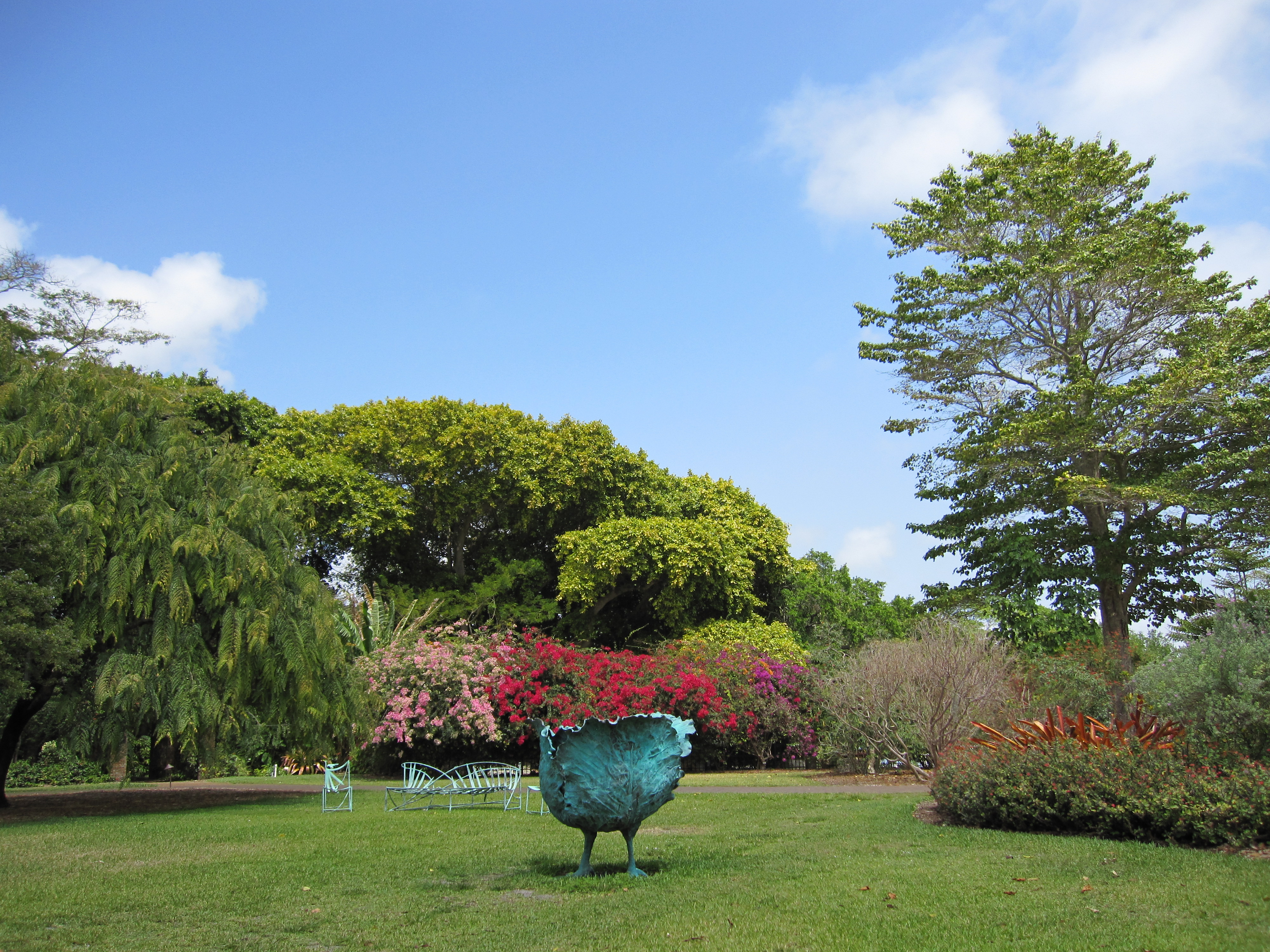
Choupatte by Claude Lalanne.

Since 2003 Fairchild Tropical Botanic Garden has had art exhibits; artists have included Patricia Van Dalen, Yayoi Kusama, Dale Chihuly, Fernando Botero, Cameron Gainer, Roy Lichtenstein, Franz West, Leyden Rodriguez-Casanova, Ursula von Rydingsvard, Michele Oka Doner, Mark Dion, Joshua Levine, and Claude and Francois-Xavier Lalanne.

New artists exhibit at Fairchild starting each December. Currently exhibits include works by Dale Chihuly, Daisy Youngblood, Freda Tschumy, and Sicis.

The garden hosts a series of seasonal weekend festivals including the International Chocolate Festival, the International Mango Festival, the Butterfly Festival, the Bird Festival, the Orchid Festival, the Ramble, the Food and Garden Festival, and the Edible Garden Festival. Other activities include concerts, and plant society meetings. Plants can be purchased during The Ramble event, usually held in the fall.

== Events ==
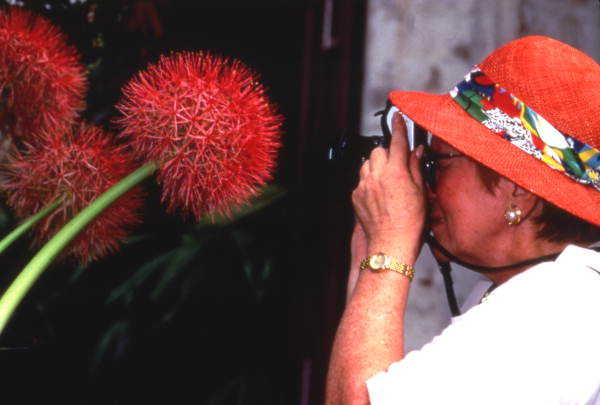
Visitor photographing a blood lily (Scadoxus multiflorus).

The Fairchild Gardens hosts a plethora of events throughout the calendar year. Events can be public festivals such as the "Night at the Garden" or the "Very Merry Garden". The public events normally revolve around a theme such as music, different foods or a holiday. For example, there are events that revolve around Jazz music called "Sip and Stroll". At this event you can listen to holiday Jazz music while strolling the Gardens. The Night at the Garden event is a popular selection among Miamians. This event is full of different lights and props that illuminate the Gardens. There are thousands of different colored lights and interactive displays to keep the guest active while at the event. The Night at the Garden is a destination for all ages and all backgrounds and is accessible for those with differing needs. The Fairchild Gardens also offers private events such as weddings, birthday parties, memorials or corporate rentals. More information on the rates or limitations of these private events can be found through the Fairchild Gardens website.

== See also ==
- List of botanical gardens in the United States
