= Glover House =

Glover House may refer to:

in Japan

- Glover Residence, also known as Glover House or Single Pine Tree (Ipponmatsu), in Glover Garden, Nagasaki, Japan

in Scotland

- Glover House (Aberdeen, Scotland)

in the United States (by state)

- Henry Burt Glover House, Anniston, Alabama, listed on the NRHP in Calhoun County, Alabama
- Glover House (Newtown, Connecticut), NRHP-listed
- John Glover House, Newtown, Connecticut, NRHP-listed
- Glover–McLeod–Garrison House, Marietta, Georgia, listed on the NRHP in Cobb County, Georgia
- Clarke–Glover Farmhouse, Southbridge, Massachusetts, NRHP-listed on the NRHP in Massachusetts
- Glover House (Quincy, Massachusetts), NRHP-listed
- Gen. John Glover House, Marblehead, Massachusetts, NRHP-listed
- Glover Cabin, Anaconda, Montana, listed on the NRHP in Deer Lodge County, Montana
- Isaac Glover House, Haddon Heights, New Jersey, listed on the NRHP in Camden County, New Jersey
- Kurth–Glover House, Lufkin, Texas, listed on the NRHP in Angelina County, Texas
- William and Nettie Glover House, Brigham, Utah, listed on the NRHP in Box Elder County, Utah
- Glover House (Spokane, Washington), listed on the NRHP in Spokane County, Washington
- Ezra Glover Jr. House, New Richmond, Wisconsin, listed on the NRHP in St. Croix County, Wisconsin

== See also ==
- Glover Mausoleum, Demopolis, Alabama
- Glover School
- House Glover, a minor Northern house in the world of A Song of Ice and Fire
