= John Glover (general) =

American general (1732–1797)

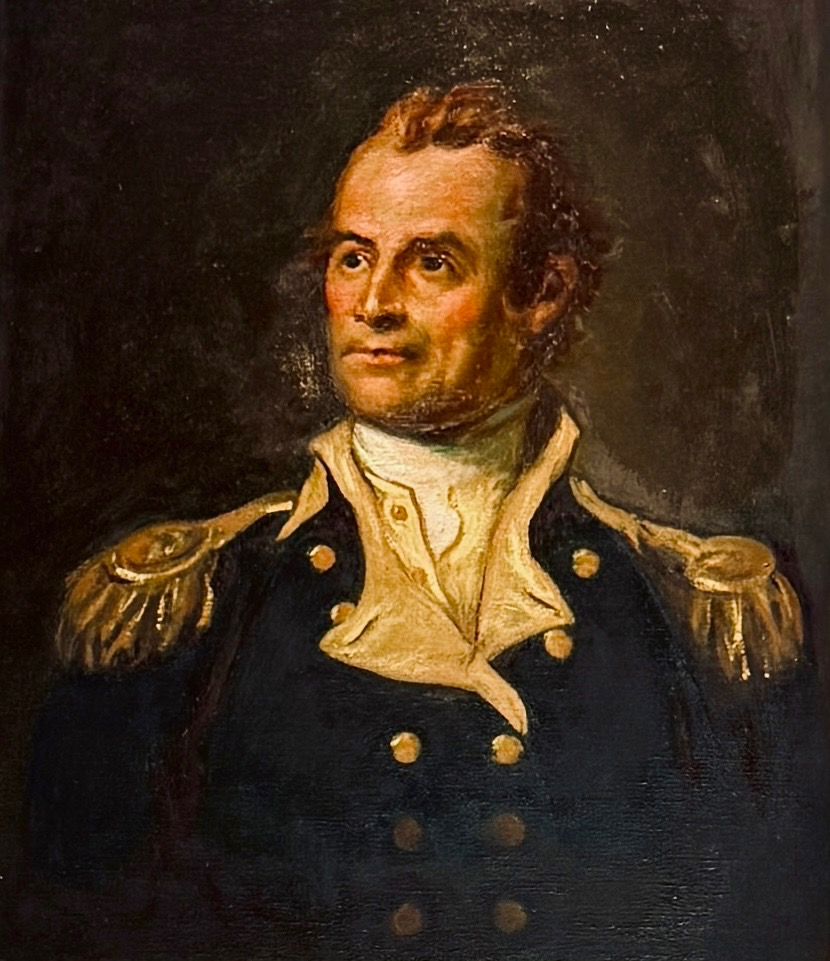

Member of the Massachusetts House of Representatives
- In office 1788–1789

Personal details
- Born: November 5, 1732 Salem, Massachusetts
- Died: January 30, 1797 (aged 64) Marblehead, Massachusetts
- Resting place: Old Burial Hill; Marblehead, Massachusetts
- Spouses: Hannah Gale (m.1754); Frances Hitchborn Fosdick (m.1781)
- Children: 10
- Occupation: Fisherman, Merchant
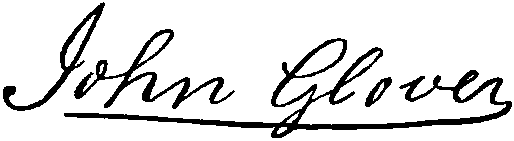
- Signature

Military service
- Allegiance: United States
- Branch/service: Continental Army
- Years of service: 1775 - 1782
- Rank: Brigadier General
- Commands: 14th Continental Regiment
- Battles/wars: American Revolutionary War

John Glover (November 5, 1732 – January 30, 1797) was an American fisherman, merchant, politician, and military leader from Marblehead, Massachusetts, who served as a brigadier general in the Continental Army during the American Revolutionary War. He is most famous in American history for his role in helping found what would become the United States Navy, along with his regiment rowing Washington across the Delaware, the Battle of Long Island, and leading one of the first integrated regiments in the American Revolution.

== Early life ==
Glover was born in Salem, Massachusetts, the son of a house carpenter. When John was four years old, his father died. Shortly thereafter, his mother and three brothers moved to the neighboring town of Marblehead. As a young man, Glover became a cordwainer and rum trader and eventually a ship owner and international merchant. He married Hannah Gale in October 1754.

Following the Boston Massacre in 1770, Committees of Correspondence were formed. Marblehead elected Glover along with future revolutionists Elbridge Gerry and Azor Orne to committee posts. After the First Continental Congress passed the non-importation agreements sanctioning trade with the British, Glover was elected to enforce the embargo as a member of the committee of inspection. In 1773, there was a deadly smallpox outbreak in the town of Marblehead. John Glover along with Azor Orne and Elbridge Gerry petitioned the town of Marblehead for a hospital to be built on Cat Island. After the town voted against it out of suspicions, they took it upon themselves to privately build the hospital on the island after receiving permission from Salem. Known as the Essex Hospital, it was successful in treating majority of the patients. However, many of Marblehead's citizens were still uneasy about it, forcing it to close, with a few locals eventually burning it down.

== Military career ==
Glover was active in the militia for many years before the Revolution, with his earliest service dating back to 1759 when he was appointed as an officer in the local Marblehead militia company. In 1775 he was elected lieutenant colonel of the 14th Continental Regiment from Marblehead, and became commander of the unit after the death of Colonel Jeremiah Lee in April 1775.

=== American Navy ===
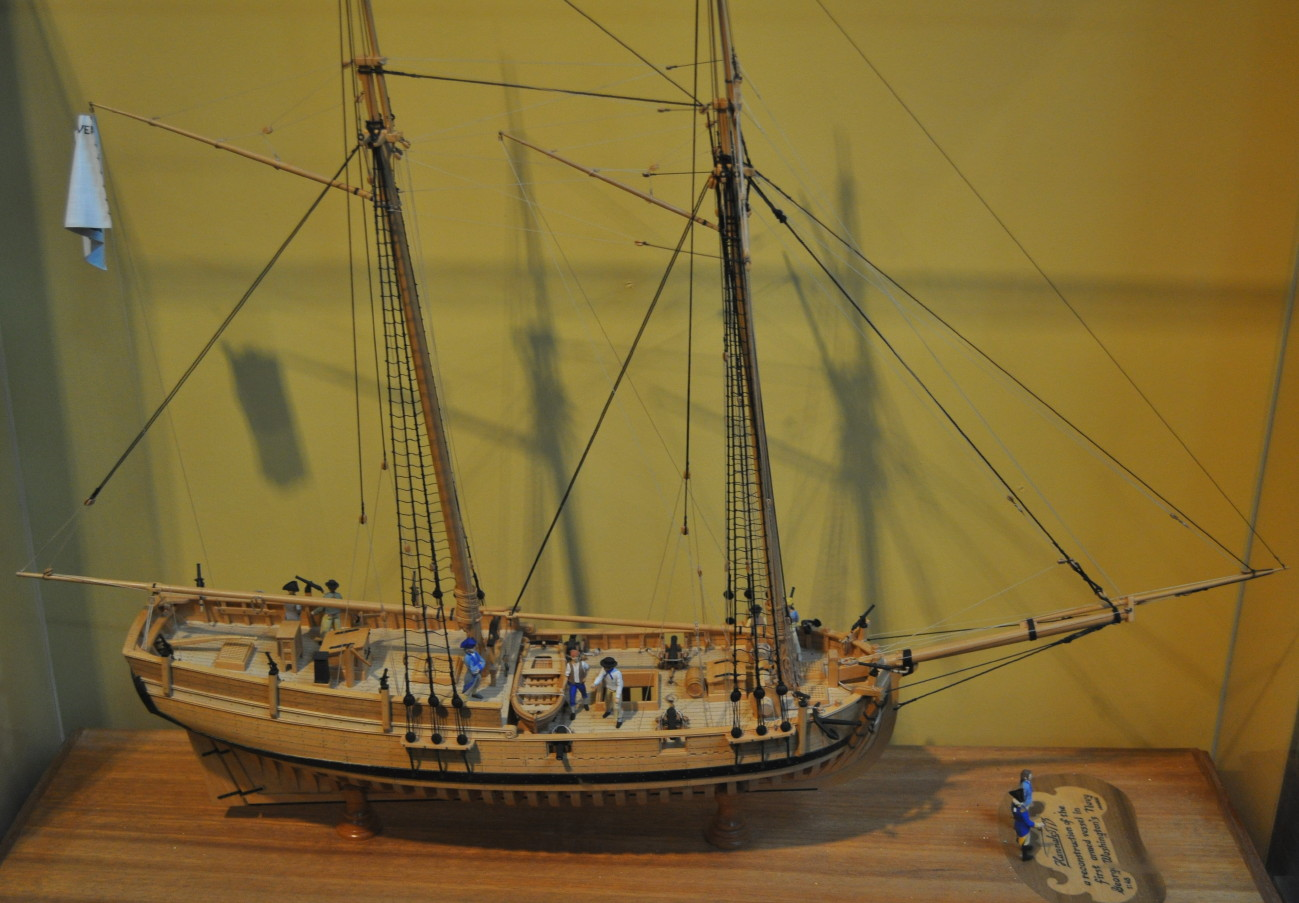
Model in the U.S. Navy Museum of first Navy ship Hannah, owned by Glover and named for his wife.

Glover marched his regiment to join the siege of Boston in June 1775. At Boston, General George Washington chartered Glover's schooner Hannah to raid British supply vessels, the first of many privateers or warship authorized by Washington. For this reason the Hannah has been occasionally called the first vessel of the Continental Navy or its later successor the United States Navy.

=== Leader of one of the first integrated American Regiments ===
The Marblehead militia or "Glover's Regiment" became the 14th Continental Regiment. John Glover was able to raise a regiment of 500 men composed of both his militia and Marblehead mariners, and termed by Washington as soldiers “bred to the sea.” This regiment became known as the "amphibious regiment" for their vital nautical skills. It was composed almost entirely of seamen, mariners and fishermen. Many of these men of were Native Americans, African-Americans, and Spanish forming the first integrated units in the new American military. The regiment's muster rolls listed one-third of the men as dark complexioned. A Pennsylvania general was shocked by the “number of negroes” treated as equals in Glover's Regiment. Most of the regiment lived in Marblehead, and came together before the war, fishing in the Grand Banks. At sea, everyone worked toward a common goal, and an individual's background did not matter, a philosophy carried over to the regiment.

=== Battle of Long Island ===
After Washington lost the Battle of Long Island (aka Battle of Brooklyn) in August 1776, Glover's Marbleheaders evacuated the army across the East River to Manhattan Island in a surprise nighttime operation, saving them from being entrapped in their fortified trenches on Brooklyn Heights. In subsequent actions of the New York campaign the regiment fought well against the British at the battles of Kip's Bay and Pell's Point.

=== Battle of Pell's Point ===
On October 14, 1776, Washington ordered the 14th and three other Massachusetts Regiments, placed under Glover's temporary command, to Eastchester to guard against a potential enemy landing at Pell's Point. On October 18, 1776, General Howe landed 4,000 men at Pell's Point to cut off Washington's escape from New York City. Col. John Glover and 750 soldiers of his small brigade were there to stop this from happening. Without a superior officer to direct his actions, Glover took command and positioned his men behind stone walls on both sides of the road. Glover's men inflicted heavy casualties on the Hessian soldiers, firing from behind concealed positions. As the Hessians advanced, Glover's troops would fall back, leapfrogging past the next group who would, in turn, begin firing. The result was an unrelenting field of fire from which the Hessians had little protection, leaving them little choice but to retreat and regroup. Glover's temporary brigade was able to delay the British advance long enough for Washington to complete his evacuation of New York.

=== Battle of Trenton ===
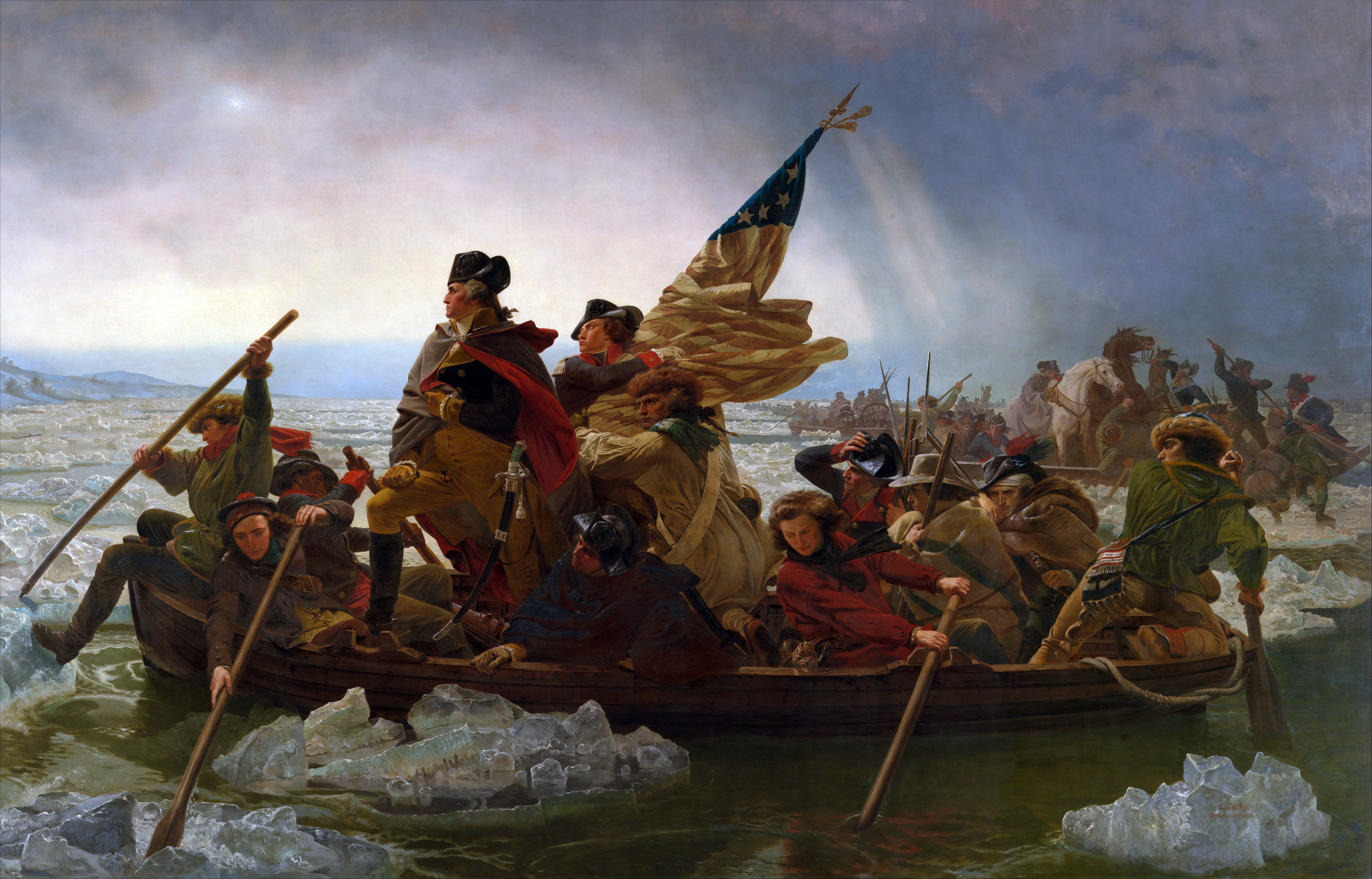
John Glover's regiment rowed George Washington's troops across the Delaware leading to a victory at the Battle of Trenton

The last action of the regiment was its most famous: ferrying Washington's army on confiscated river coal ore boats from upstream across the Delaware River at night for a surprise attack on Hessian forces at the Battle of Trenton in New Jersey on the morning of December 26, 1776.

=== Saratoga campaign ===
After Trenton, Glover went home to tend to his sick wife and look to business affairs. He turned down a promotion to brigadier general in February 1777, but rejoined the war and accepted the promotion after a personal appeal from General Washington. As commander of a brigade made up of four Massachusetts regiments, he served in the successful Saratoga campaign with General Schuyler along the Hudson River in the summer and fall of 1777. He would later join the attack on the British encampment with General Gates, leading to the surrender and capture of 5,791 troops under the command of General John Burgoyne. General Glover was assigned to escort the prisoners back to Cambridge, MA, where his regiment was greeted all the way back with victorious cheers by spectators along the road.

=== West Point and Battle of Rhode Island ===
In the winter of 1778, his brigade joined Washington's encampment at Valley Forge. In June of that year, Washington assigned him the command of Fort Arnold, at West Point, where he surpervised the construction of the forts and redoubts in the area. In the following years he would take part in Battle of Rhode Island, where he was able to muster two entire companies in Boston and Salem, with the majority of the volunteers from Marblehead to help reinforce the effort to take back Rhode Island. For the remainder of the war, he was stationed back along the Hudson River at West Point, guarding against British moves up the river from New York City.

=== Retirement from military service ===
After Cornwallis' surrender at Yorktown in October 1781, it would take two years for a peace treaty to be signed, so the army was not yet disbanded. During this time, General Glover was ordered to Massachusetts to take charge and muster recruits. In July 1782, General John Glover retired from the army, due to his failing health and was placed on the half-pay established by a resolution of Congress.

== Later life ==
Hannah, Glover's first wife, died in 1778. He married again, in 1781, to widow Frances (Hitchborn) Fosdick, a relative of Paul Revere. John Glover moved to the Glover Farm in 1782, on the current day border of Marblehead, Salem and Swampscott. He had purchased it the year before in 1781 from the state, that had confiscated the property from a British loyalist. In 1784, the Marquis de Lafayette visited Glover, who fought with him in the American Revolution during which they "had shared the hardships and victories of the battlefield as well as the friendship of Gen. George Washington."

=== Political career ===
Glover served in local offices including six terms as a town selectman, delegate to the state convention that ratified the U.S. Constitution (1788), and two-term member of the Massachusetts House of Representatives (1788–1789). During his 1789 tour of the United States, President George Washington made a detour to see Glover and thank the residents of Marblehead for their service during the war.

== Death ==
Glover died on January 30, 1797, after contracting hepatitis. He was buried in a brick tomb on Marblehead's Old Burial Hill. His death is now commemorated annually by Glover's Regiment, with a memorial lantern procession to his tomb and a three-volley gun salute.

== Historic residences ==
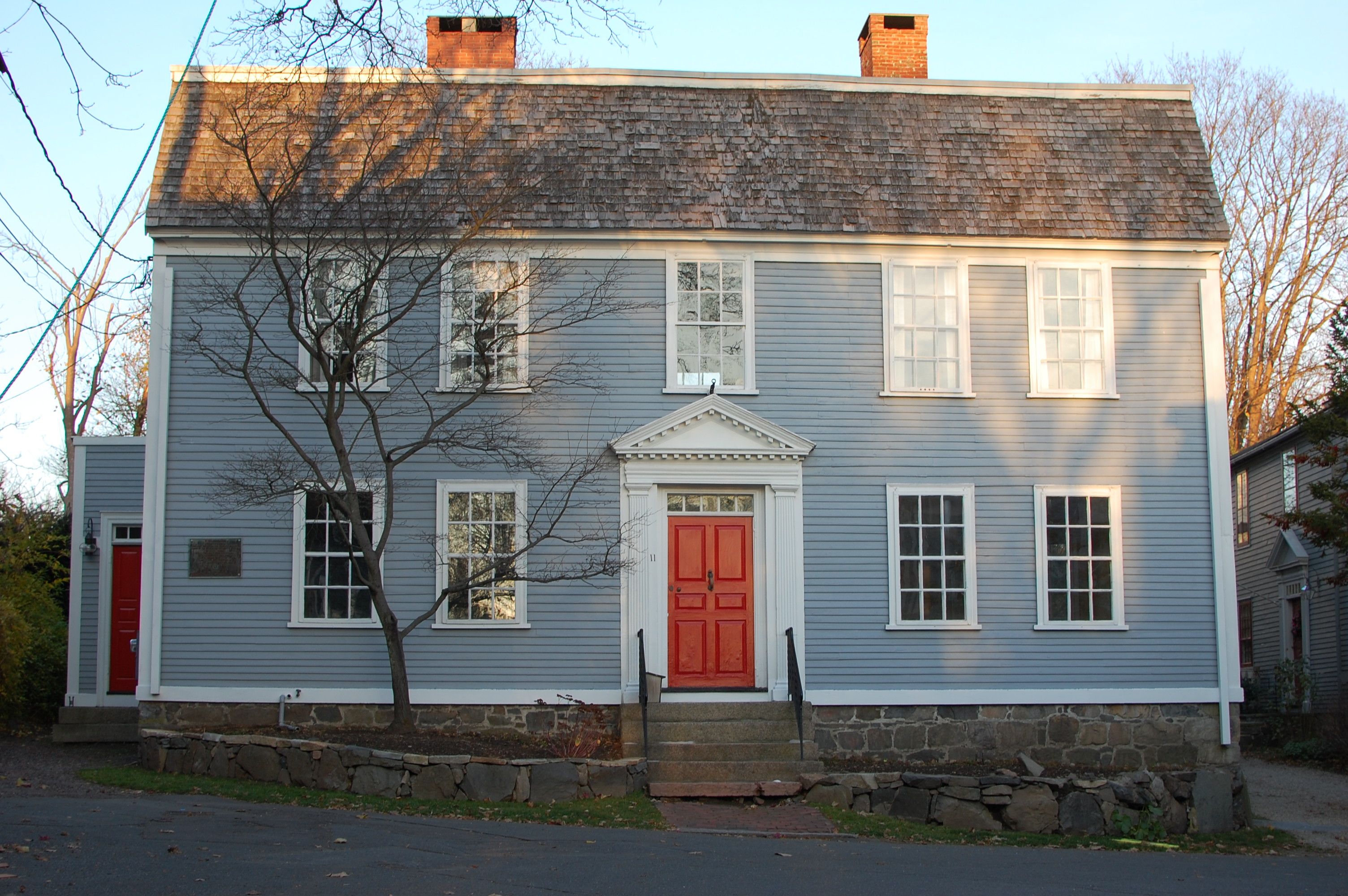
John Glover House, in Marblehead, MA, built in 1762 and a National Historic Landmark

Glover and his family lived in house he built in 1762, now known as the John Glover House, a National Historic Landmark. The General Glover Farmhouse, originally built in what was then Salem, and now in Swampscott, was also built in the 1700s, and it is where Glover lived beginning in 1782 after retiring from the military, until his death in 1797. The house stands today but was threatened by demolition in 2025, resulting in a preservation effort Save the Glover to prevent the loss of Glover's final home.

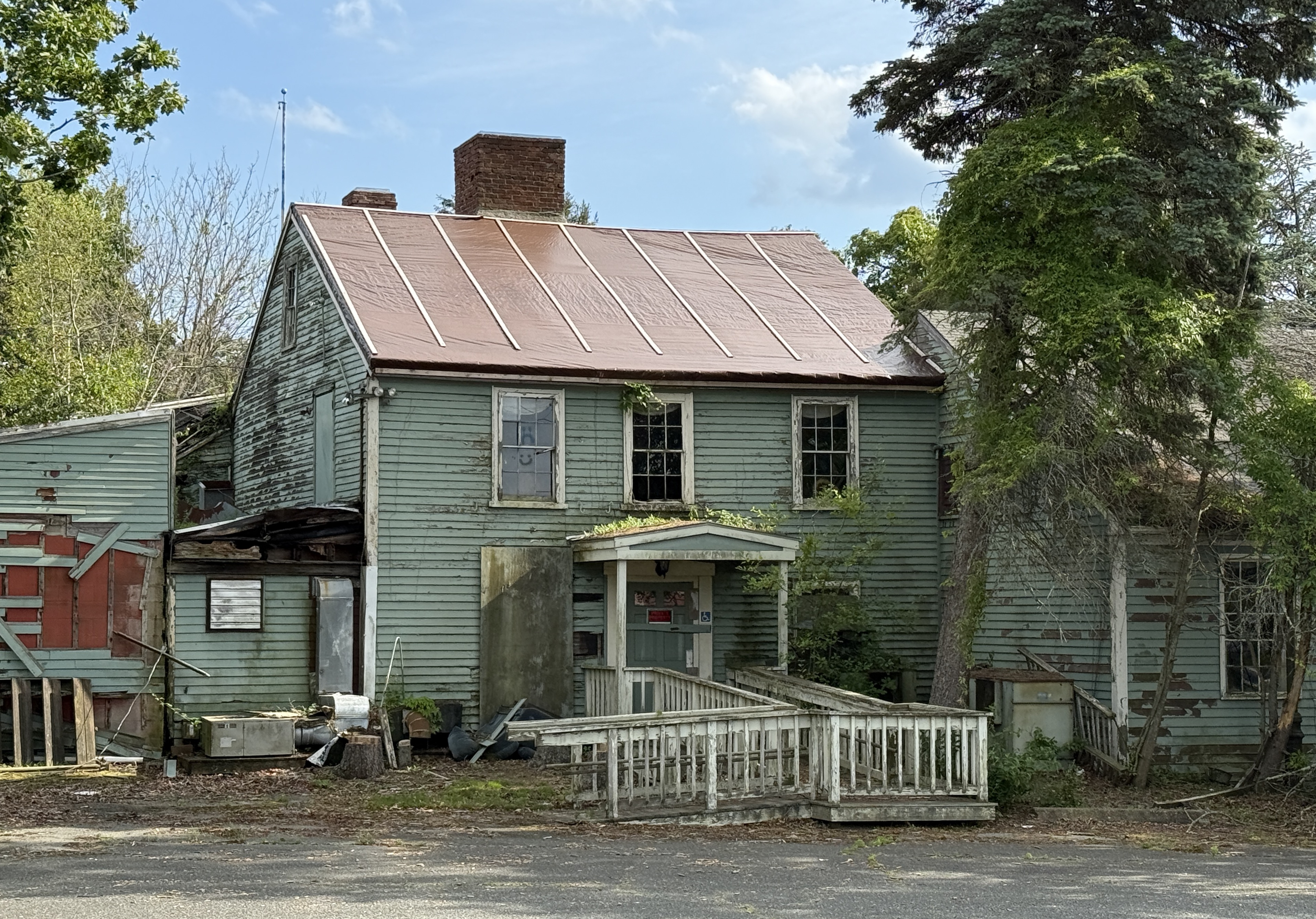
General Glover's Farmhouse and final home in Swampscott, MA

== Monuments and legacy ==
=== Monuments and sites ===
- Statue of John Glover on Commonwealth Avenue in Boston.
- The General John Glover House is located in Marblehead, MA
- General Glover House & Farm in Swampscott, MA
- Glover's Brigade Monument, Valley Forge National Historical Park
- Glover's Rock in Pelham Bay Park, is a memorial to his leadership in the Battle of Pell's Point.
- Brookland Ferry Landing Memorial, in Brooklyn, NY, commemorating the evacuation of Long Island and recognizing Glover's contribution.
- Commemorated at St. Paul's Church National Historic Site, NY

=== Namesake ===
- The frigate USS Glover (FF-1098) was named for him, and sponsored by Mrs. William S. Pederson Sr., and Mrs. Claude V. Signer, his great-great-great-granddaughters.
- Glover, Vermont: On November 20, 1783, he was awarded the charter for the town of Glover, Vermont, as its prime proprietor, in honor of his service.
- Glover School in Marblehead was named after him, located down the street from his final home.
- Fort Glover in Marblehead, originally built for the Revolutionary War as the Huit's Head Battery, was named for him when rebuilt in the Civil War.
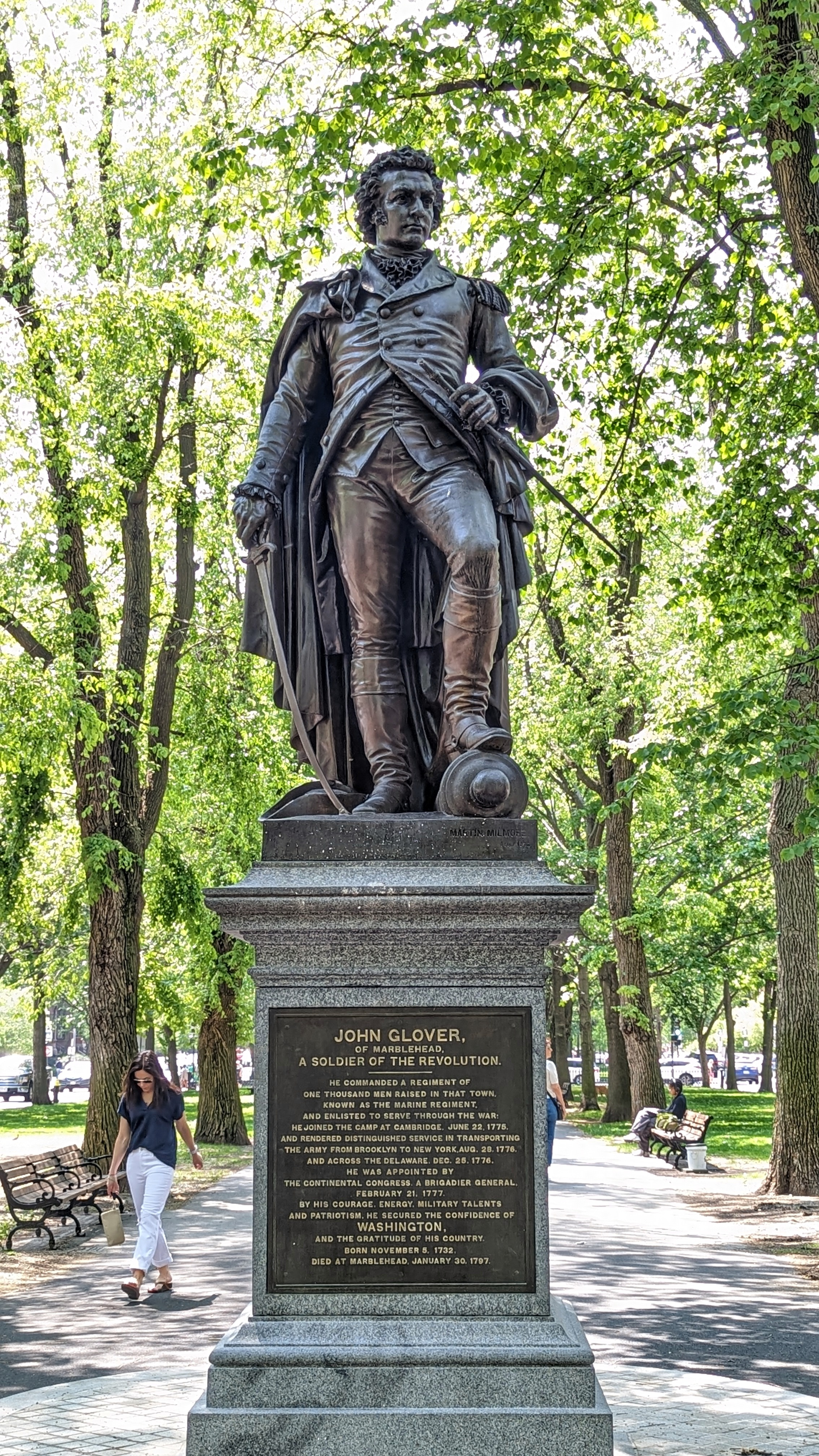
Statue of Glover on Commonwealth Avenue, Boston by Martin Milmore (1875)

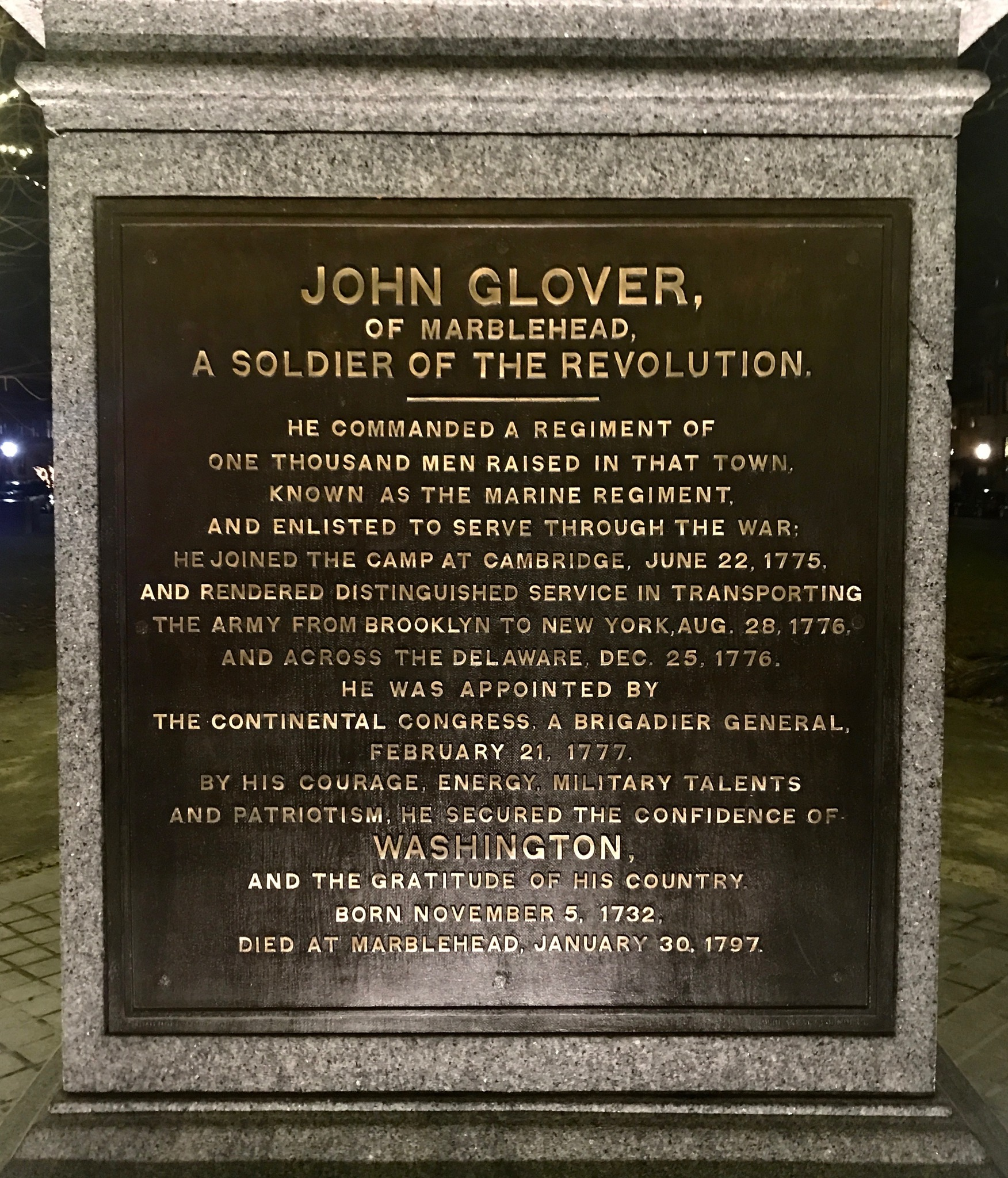
Inscription on Statue of Glover on Commonwealth Avenue, Boston

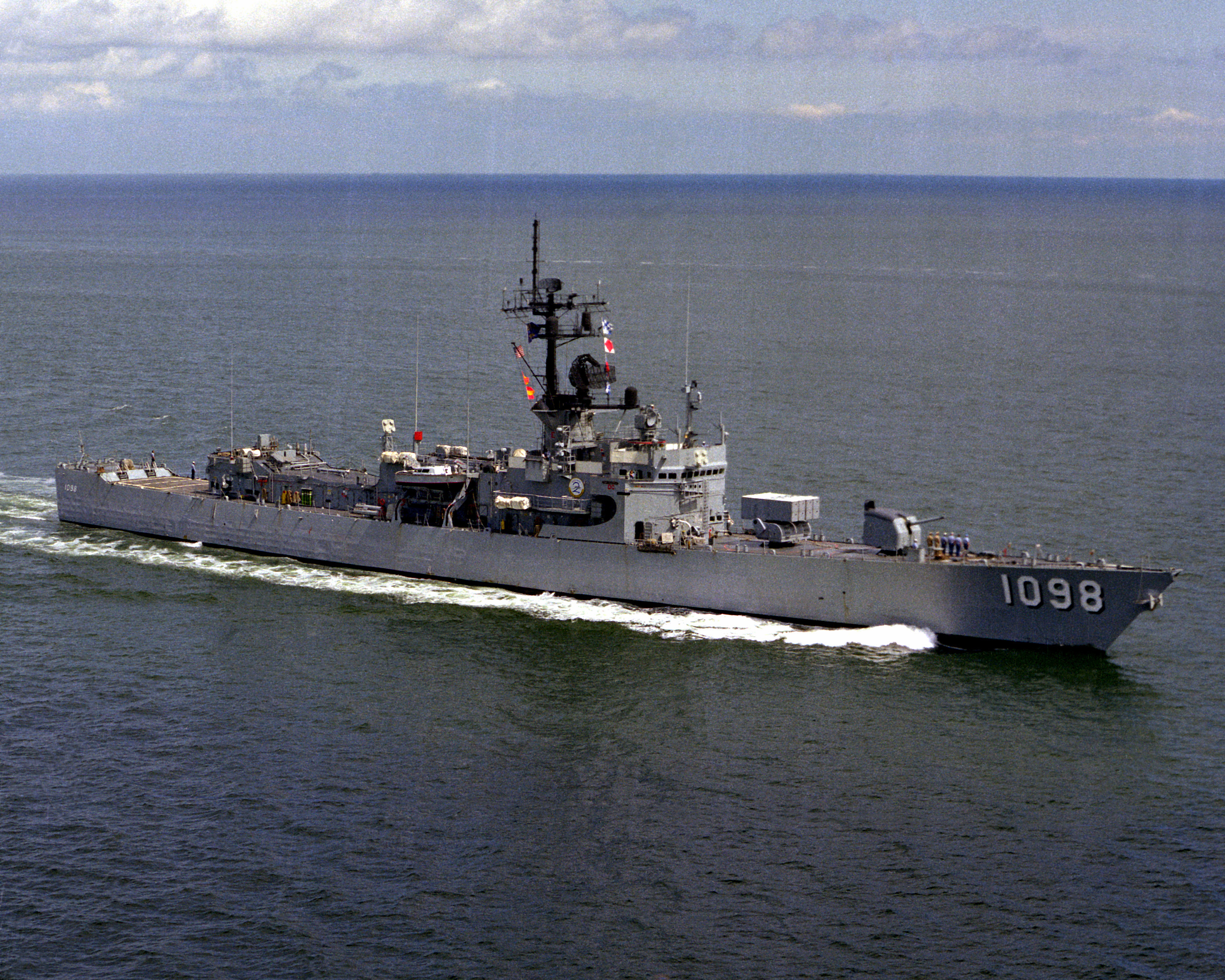
The frigate USS Glover (FF-1098), named in honor of General John Glover

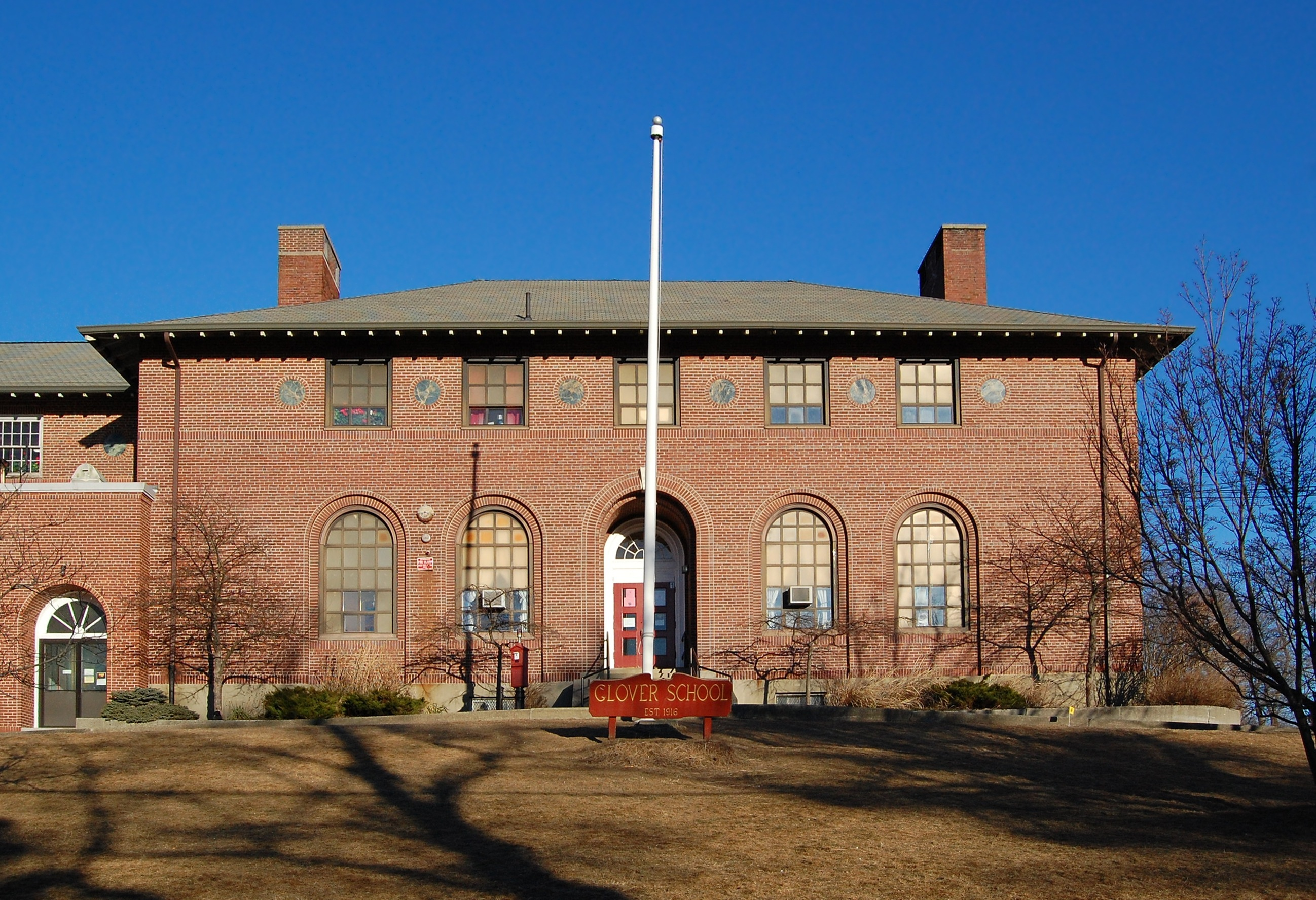
The original Glover School (1916) in Marblehead, MA

== Glover's Regiment ==
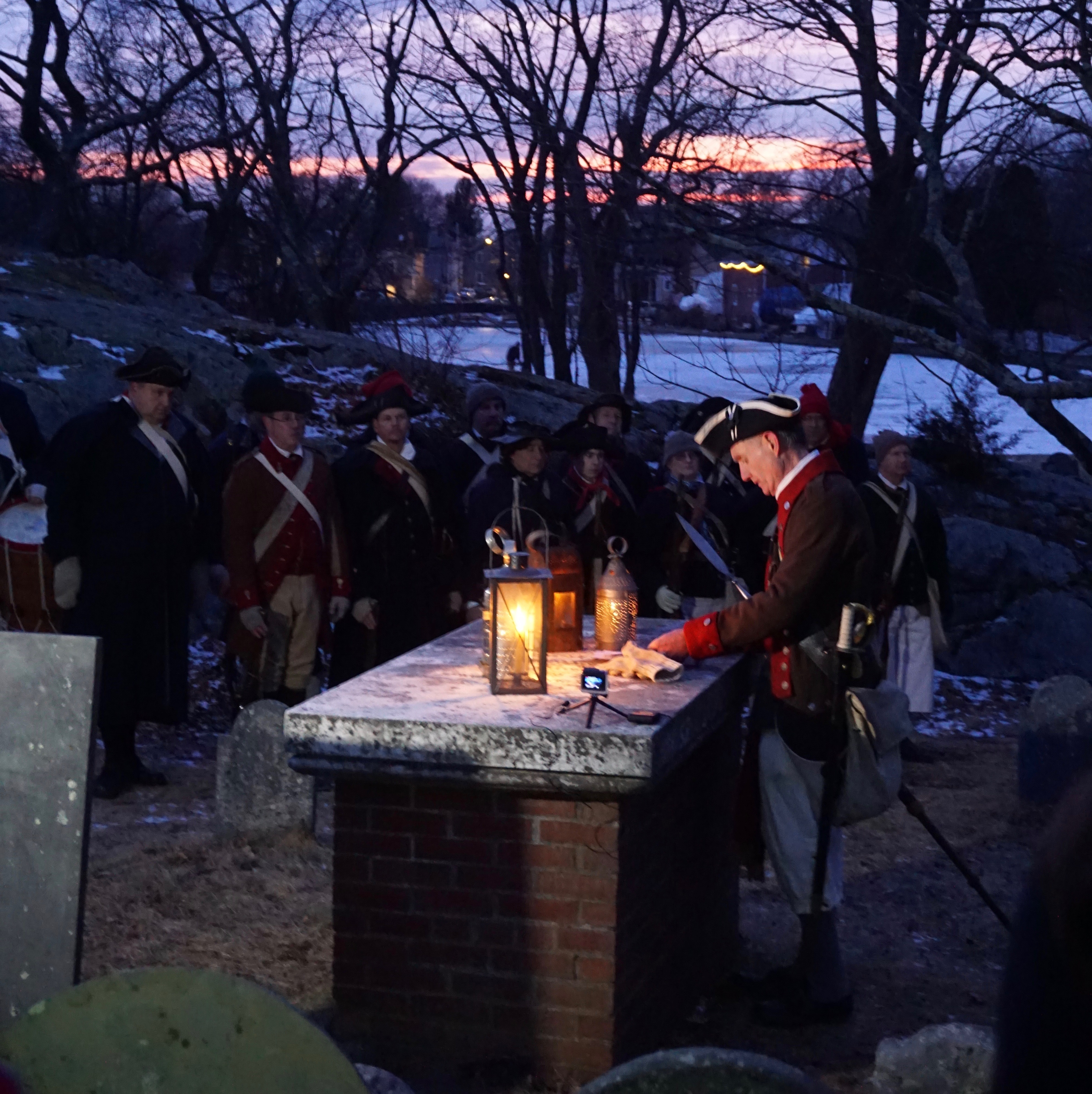
Glover's Tomb at Old Burial Hill, Marblehead during Glover's Marblehead Regiment annual commemoration memorial march

In honor of General Glover's legacy, founded for the bicentennial, and continued to this day, Glover's Marblehead Regiment, a dedicated group of re-enactors take part in special events throughout the year commemorating the achievements of Glover and his regiment.

== Paintings and portraits ==
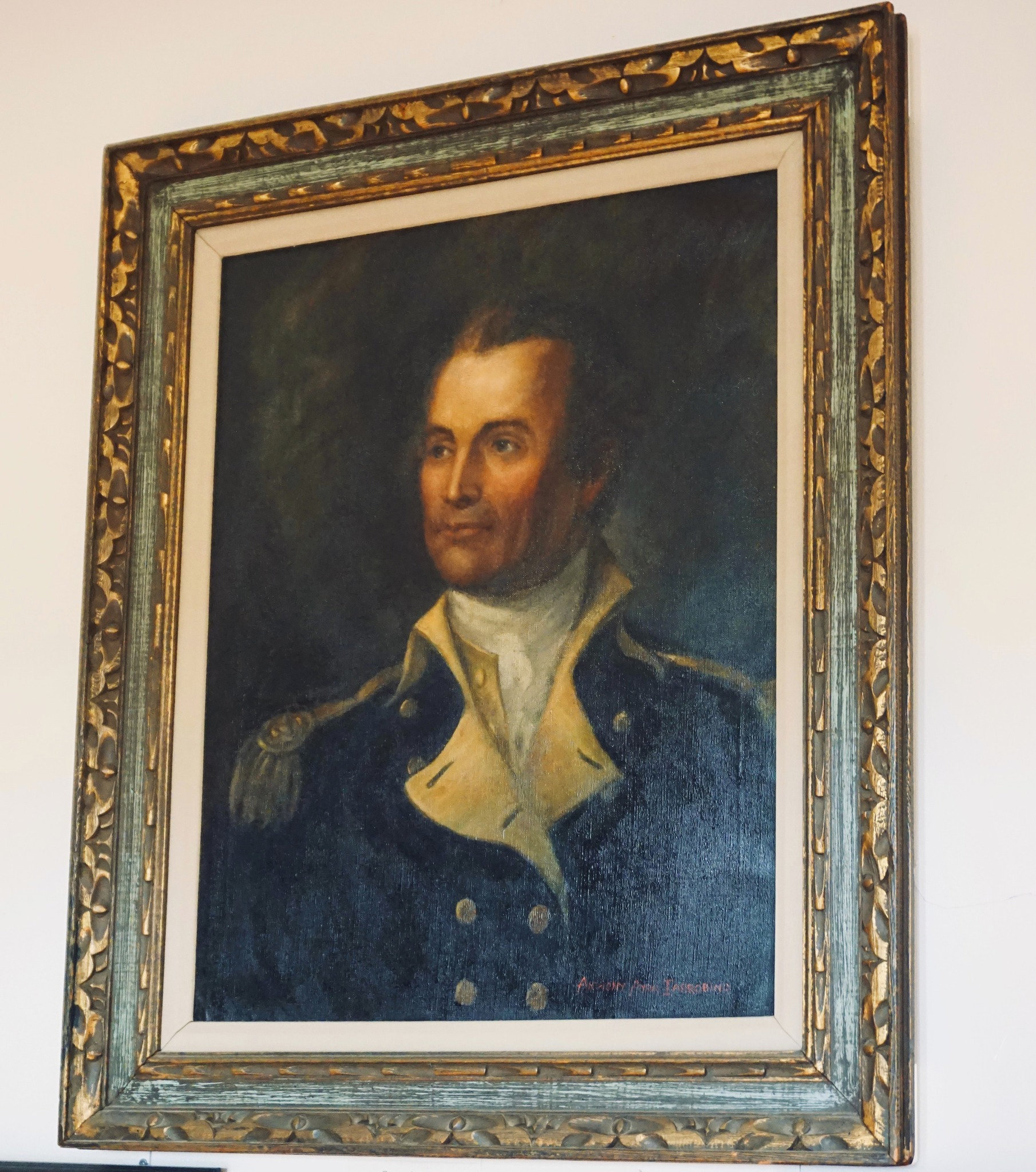
Portrait of General John Glover commissioned for naval vessel USS Glover

- The Capture of the Hessians at Trenton, December 26, 1776, depicting Glover 2nd from the right, by John Trumbull.
- Brigadier General Glover, sketch portrait, by John Trumbull, 1794, Yale University Art Gallery in New Haven, Connecticut
- Surrender of General Burgoyne, oil painting, by John Trumbull, 1821, United States Capitol Rotunda in Washington, D.C.
- The Capture of the Hessians at Trenton, December 26, 1776, oil painting, by John Trumbull, 1828, Yale University Art Gallery in New Haven, Connecticut
- General John Glover, oil on canvas, by Henry Sutton, 1964, Abbot Hall, Marblehead, MA
- General John Glover, oil painting, by Anthony Ayres Iarrobino, 1965, originally commissioned for USS Glover, given to town when ship was decommissioned, at Abbot Hall, Marblehead, MA
- The Battle of Pell’s Point, depicting Glover and his men fending off the British. Mural by James Monroe Hewlett, in the Veteran's Memorial Hall, Bronx County Courthouse, New York City

== Books and literature ==
- A Memoir of General John Glover, of Marblehead by William P. Upham (1863)
- History and Traditions of Marblehead by Samuel Roads (1880)
- Gen. John Glover and his Marblehead regiment in the Revolutionary War : A paper read before the Marblehead Historical Society, by Nathan P. Sanborn (1903)
- Glover's Marblehead Regiment, Frank Augustine Gardner, (1908)
- General John Glover and His Marblehead Mariners, by George Bilias (1960)
- Washington's Savior: General John Glover and the American Revolution: General John Glover and the American Revolution, by Richard A. Brayall (2013)
- George Washington's surprise attack : a new look at the battle that decided the fate of America, Thomas Tucker, (2013)
- The Indispensables: The Diverse Soldier-Mariners Who Shaped the Country, Formed the Navy, and Rowed Washington Across the Delaware, by Patrick K. O'Donnell (2021)
- Saving Washington's Army: The Brilliant Last Stand of General John Glover at the Battle of Pell's Point, New York, October 18, 1776, by Phillip Thomas Tucker (2022)
- Washington's Hero: General John Glover, by Frank Westcott (2024)

== Popular culture ==
In the 2000 television movie The Crossing, the part of Glover is a pivotal character, and played by Sebastian Roché.
