= Simon Bradstreet House =

Historic house in Massachusetts, United States

- U.S. Historic district – Contributing property
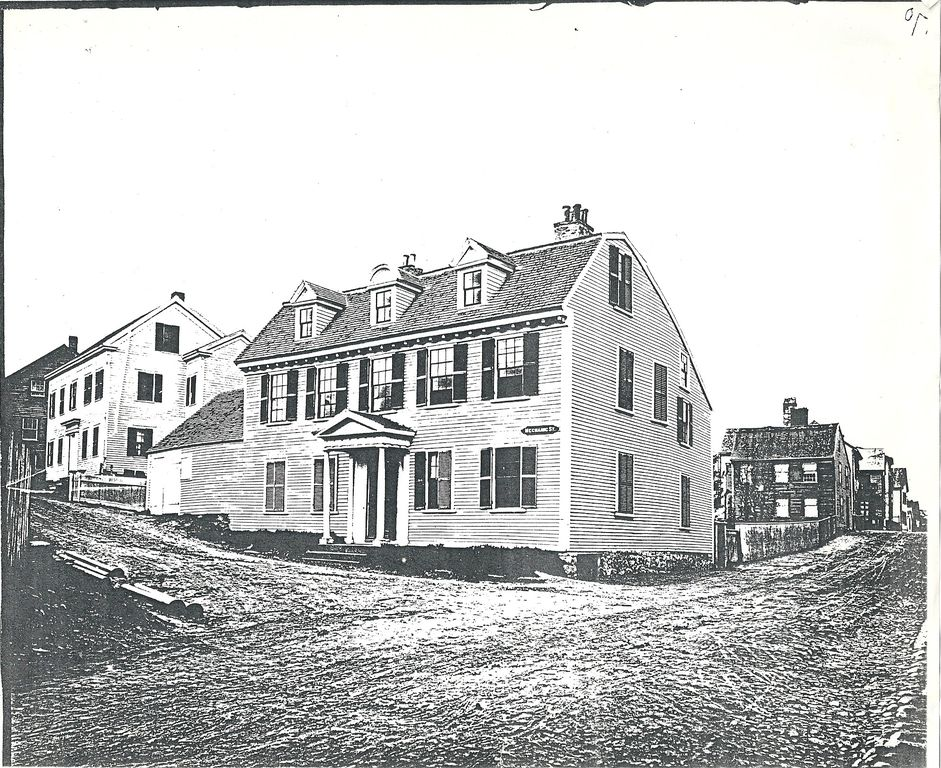
- Photo of 1 Mechanic St, Marblehead, MA

- Location within Massachusetts Location within the United States
- Location: 1 Mechanic Street; Marblehead, Massachusetts
- Coordinates: 42.50642°N 70.84871°W
- Built: 1738
- Architectural style: Georgian
- Part of: Marblehead Historic District (ID84002402)
- Designated CP: January 10, 1984

The Simon Bradstreet House is a historic house built in 1723 located at 1 Mechanic Street, at the corner of Pearl Street, in Marblehead, Massachusetts. It is a contributing building in the National Register of Historic Places-listed Marblehead Historic District. The house was erected by the Rev. Simon Bradstreet, the great grandson of the last bay colony governor. and the second minister of the Second Congregational Church.

The house is noted to be one of the "more substantial" Georgian style buildings in the district, being a five-bay, two-and-a-half story structure featuring dormers, a pedimented entry, and a gambrel roof, in contrast to lesser three-bay structures.

On January 4, 1738, Simon Bradstreet was ordained and received £140 from the General Court, which had been voted to compensate Marblehead for the loss of his predecessor Rev. Edward Holyoke, who left to become the president of Harvard College. These funds were used to construct the house. He served as minister from 1738 to 1771. Bradstreet graduated from Harvard university in 1731 and gave the valedictory oration.

Simon Bradstreet was replaced as minister by Isaac Story, Story was introduced to his congregation in Marblehead by Ebenezer Pemberton in his sermon to the community. Story married the daughter of Bradstreet (Rebecca Bradstreet) and moved into the house. Story was born in 1749 and a native of Boston, a graduate of the College of New Jersey in 1768. He was the minister of the Second Congregational Church of Marblehead in Marblehead, Massachusetts, from 1771-1802. Story was acquainted with and corresponded with several of the founding fathers, including George Washington, John Adams, Thomas Jefferson, and James Madison. Story died in 1816.

Story's sermons were mentioned in the diary of John Quincy Adams. Although Story's tenure at Marblehead was lengthy, his relationship with the congregation became increasingly strained and he resigned his pastorate in 1802. Following his resignation, he wrote Thomas Jefferson several times requesting a civil appointment. He was made a commissioner of bankruptcy in 1802, only to be informed by Thomas Jefferson that his appointment was a mistake and was intended for Joseph Story, his nephew.

The Cambridge room in Cambridge, MA received a collection of letters between Story and Washington and Jefferson that are in excellent condition and are available for the public to research.

Letter from Tho. Jefferson to Isaac Story in 1801

Chance Bradstreet, the African American slave that was a subject of the "within these walls" exhibit at the National Museum of American History was born in this home in 1762. He was later sold to Abraham Dodge of Ipswitch by Isaac Story. A copy of the agreement between Isaac Story and Abraham Dodge to lease Chance is shown below.

Agreement between Isaac Story and Abraham Dodge related to Chance Bradstreet.

It is also the house that William Story, Esq, the father of Reverend Isaac Story, resided at the time of his death. William was the Clerk of the Admiralty, prior to the American revolution, and at the time of the stamp act being enacted his office and later the home of Thomas Hutchinson was entered on the evening of August 26, 1765 by a crowd of angry citizens and vandalized. Possibly the attack on Story, was a carefully calculated effort to destroy records of debt and other incriminating evidence against Massachusetts merchants. But the indisputable fact was that William Story, who stood with Sam Adams in 1763, stood with Thomas Hutchinson in 1765. He was also a client of John Adams when we was practicing law in Boston

One of William Story's sons Dr. Elisha Story was a participant in the Boston Tea Party and also moved to Marblehead, where the home still stands at 102 Washington St. One of William Story's grandchildren, Joseph Story, went on to become an Associate Justice of the Supreme Court.

House prior to previous renovation.

== Sources ==
- Jefferson, Thomas. "To Thomas Jefferson from Isaac Story" (August 20, 1802) [Textual record]. The Papers of Thomas Jefferson, Series: Correspondence, File: Correspondence. Princeton, NJ: Princeton University, Princeton University.
- Virginia A. Fitch and Kathryn Kubie (October 1983). "National Register of Historic Places Inventory/Nomination: Old Town and Gingerbread Hill / Marblehead Historic District". Massachusetts Historical Commission. (text document available for download here click on "NR" button, although accompanying photos are not available there)
- Pemberton, Ebenezer (1771). A Sermon Preached at the Ordination of the Reverend Mr. Isaac Story, to the Pastoral Care of the Second Church in Marblehead, in Conjunction with the Rev. Mr. Simon Bradstreet. Marblehead, MA: Samuel Hall.
- Roads, Samuel (1887). A Guide to Marblehead. Marblehead, MA: M.H. Graves.
- Shipton, Clifford K (1951). Biographical Sketches of those who attended Harvard College in the classes 1726-1730 with biographical and other notes. Westmoreland, NH: Hurley Books Inc.
- Child, Christopher Challender (October 2010). "American Ancestors". Fall 2010, Vol. 11 Issue 4. New England Historic Genealogical Society (NEHGS).
- Adams, John Quincy (1788). Diary of John Quincy Adams, Volume 2. Quincy, MA: Harvard University Press.
- Newmyer, Kent (1986). Supreme Court Justice Joseph Story:Statesman of the Old Republic. North Carolina: North Carolina Press.
- Bernard, Francis (September 2, 1765). "A Proclamation". The Boston Post-Boy & Advertiser. Vol. 1. Boston, MA. p. 180.
- Cutter, William (1908). Genealogical and personal memoirs relating to the families of Boston and eastern Massachusetts Volume I. Delhi, India: Gyan e-Books.
