= USS Glover =

Garcia-class frigate of the US Navy

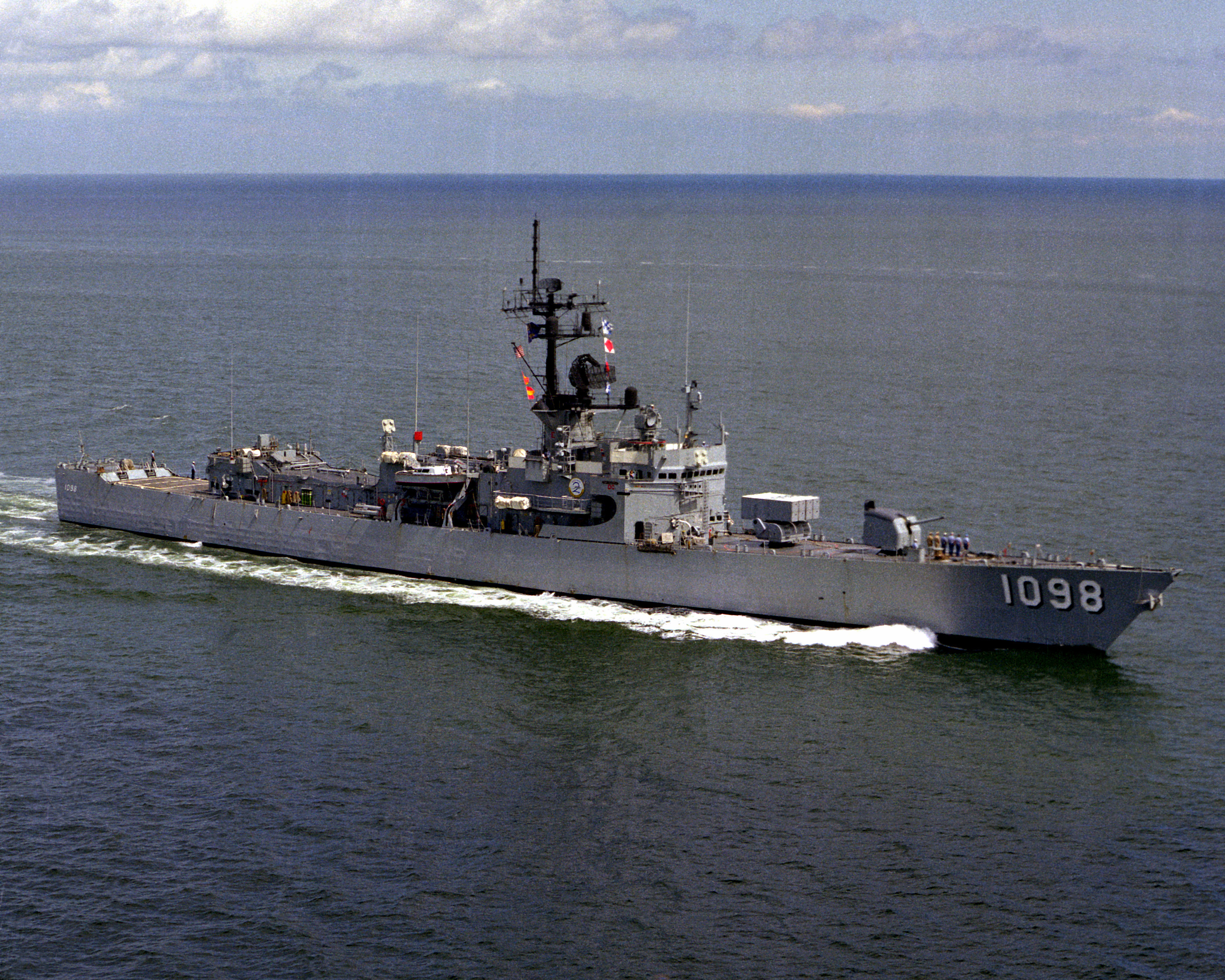
- USS Glover underway in 1982.

History

United States
- Name: USS Glover
- Namesake: John Glover
- Awarded: 28 June 1961
- Builder: Bath Iron Works
- Laid down: 29 July 1963
- Launched: 17 April 1965
- Commissioned: 13 November 1965
- Decommissioned: 15 June 1990 Ship transferred to Military Sealift Command as a research vessel
- Stricken: 20 November 1992
- Identification: FF-1098
- Fate: Sold for scrap 15 April 1994
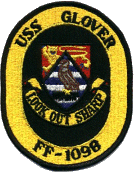
- Badge

General characteristics as (AGDE-1)
- Class & type: Garcia-class frigate
- Displacement: 3,426 tons
- Length: 414 ft 6 in (126.34 m)
- Beam: 44 ft 1 in (13.44 m)
- Draft: 24 ft 2 in (7.37 m)
- Speed: 27.5 knots (50.9 km/h; 31.6 mph)
- Complement: 239+12 FAST Company Marines for security detail
- Sensors & processing systems: Sonar AN/SQS-26AXR, AN/SQS-35 IVDS. Test platform for LFAS and RMASS Sonars
- Armament: 2 x triple Mk 32 SVTT torpedo tubes; 1 x Mk 30 5 in (130 mm)/38 cal gun; 1 x Mk 16 ASROC anti-submarine rocket launcher

USS Glover (FF-1098) was a Garcia-class frigate originally modified for research use and commissioned as (AGDE-1) on 3 November 1965. Glover was laid down 29 July 1963 by the Bath Iron Works, in Bath, Maine and launched on 17 April 1965 with sponsors Mrs. William S. Pederson, Sr., and Mrs. Claude V. Signer, great-great-great-granddaughters of General John Glover.

Fitted out with advanced sonar and antisubmarine weapons, Glover was designed to serve as an experimental research escort for developing and testing the latest antisubmarine weapons systems. A pump-jet propulsion reduces underwater noise and gyroscopically controlled fin stabilizers reduce ocean rolling. As a research ship, she tested equipment designed to more readily detect and track enemy submarines, and evaluated tactics and procedures which were used on future classes of escorts. Capable of participating in offensive operations against submarines, she provided support for hunter killer groups, amphibious forces, and ocean convoys.

== History ==
Glover joined the U.S. Atlantic Fleet in 1966 as a unit of Cruiser-Destroyer Forces and operated along the Atlantic Coast and in the Caribbean.

=== 1966–1974 ===
In 1966 Glover (AGDE-1) was modified in the Boston Naval Shipyard with electronic testing and data recording hardware. In 1968 she re-entered the Boston Naval Shipyard for more modifications and the addition of a variable depth sonar device. In 1970, she made her first Atlantic crossing and Mediterranean cruise visiting ports in Spain, France, Italy, and Greece. While conducting sonar tests in the Mediterranean, she was observed very closely by Soviet Navy vessels. One almost rear ended the ship while attempting to obtain a close look at the variable depth sonar. In September 1974 she entered Boston Naval Shipyard for modifications.

United States Senator Rick Scott (R-Florida) was a radar operator on the USS Glover from 1971 to 1974.

=== 1974–1994 ===
Glover was redesignated (AGFF-1) in 1975, and redesignated a frigate (FF-1098) in 1979. Glover went through a major overhaul at South Boston Shipyard in 1988, getting a boiler refit and new sonar overhaul. She was decommissioned on 15 June 1990, transferred to Military Sealift Command (MSC) as a research vessel for EDO Corp and NUSC and reclassified as USNS Glover (T-AGFF 1). She was scrapped at the Philadelphia Naval Shipyard in 1994.

== Awards ==
- Coast Guard Unit Commendation
- Coast Guard Meritorious Unit Commendation
- Navy Expeditionary Medal
- National Defense Service Medal

In addition to the above, Glover received a letter of commendation from the Secretary of the Navy.
