= Marblehead Historic District =

Historic district in Massachusetts, United States

- U.S. National Register of Historic Places
- U.S. Historic district
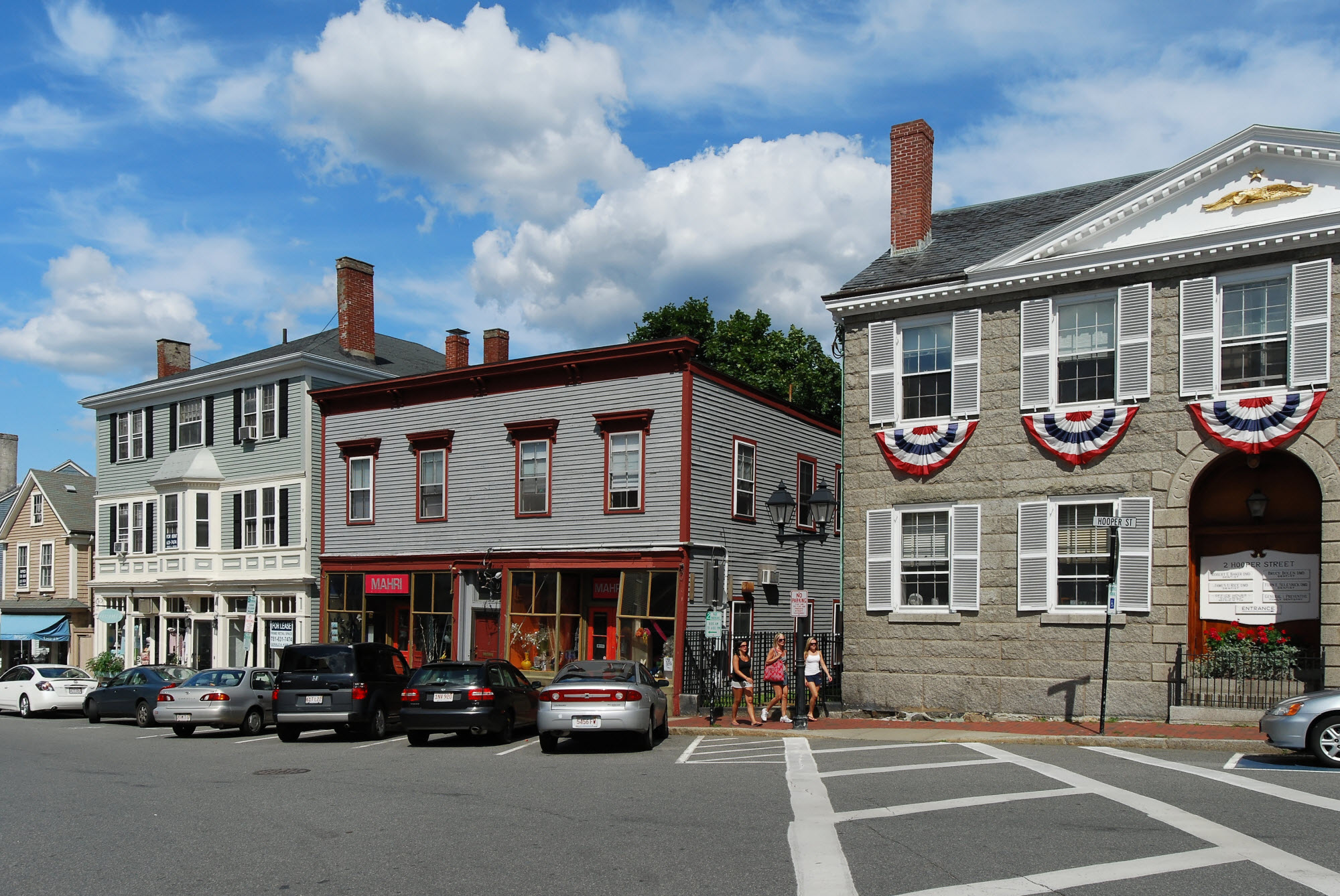

- Location within Massachusetts Location within the United States
- Location: Roughly bounded by Marblehead Harbor, Waldron Court, Essex, Elm, Pond, and Norman Sts., Marblehead, Massachusetts
- Coordinates: 42°30′15″N 70°50′58″W
- Area: 2,300 acres (930 ha)
- Built: 1670
- Architectural style: Georgian, Federal, Queen Anne
- NRHP reference No.: 84002402
- Added to NRHP: January 10, 1984

The Marblehead Historic District is a 2,300-acre (930 ha) historic district roughly bounded by Marblehead Harbor, Waldron Court, Essex, Elm, Pond, and Norman Streets in Marblehead, Massachusetts. Among its notable features are Fort Sewall, a coastal fortification with origins dating to 1644, and two National Historic Landmarks, the General John Glover House, the Jeremiah Lee Mansion, and the Simon Bradstreet House.

The district includes 988 contributing buildings and features Georgian, Federal, Queen Anne, and other styles of architecture. The area was added to the National Register of Historic Places in 1984.

It includes some buildings from the 1600s and about 200 houses in total that were built before the American Revolution.

The National Register nomination notes that "the extraordinarily well preserved historic character of the Marblehead Historic District can be attributed to a number of factors: a deep sense of history and pride in the community; hilly terrain and historical building patterns which discourage a major thoroughfare; vigilant fire protection; and increasing preservation awareness and efforts."

Some of the district was protected by creation of two local historic districts in 1968 by the town of Marblehead under the Massachusetts General Court Historic District Act, the Gingerbread Hill and the Old Town historic districts. These districts, if not the entire Marblehead Historic District, are administered by the Old and Historic Districts Commission, which governs on proposed changes to within-district structures.

== See also ==
- National Register of Historic Places listings in Essex County, Massachusetts
