= Battle of Pell's Point =

Battle of the American Revolutionary War

Coordinates: 40.86617°N 73.81048°W

Battle of Pellham
- Part of the American Revolutionary War
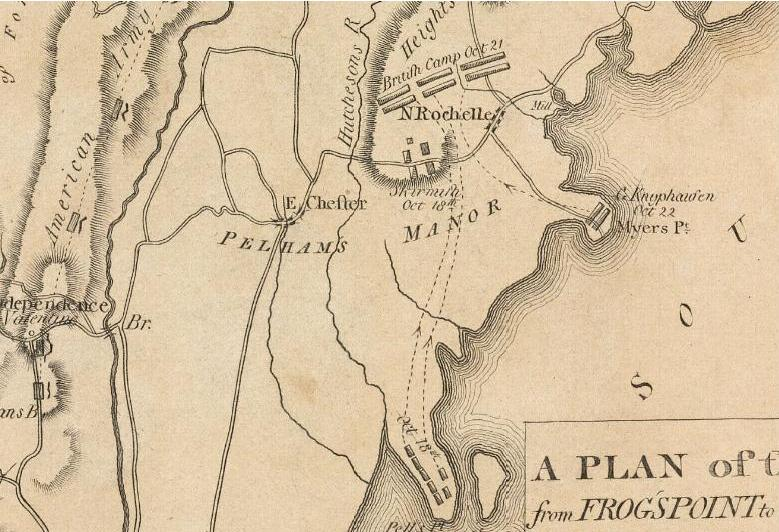
- A period map of the Manor of Pelham and the surrounding area. The Bronx was part of Westchester County at this time
Date	Friday, October 18, 1776
Location	The Bronx, New York City; Pelham Manor, Southern Westchester, N.Y.
Result	British victory

Belligerents
United States	Great Britain; Hesse-Kassel

Commanders and leaders
(United States) John Glover	(Kingdom of Great Britain) William Howe (Kingdom of Great Britain) Henry Clinton

Strength
750	4,000

Casualties and losses
8 killed 13 wounded	3 British killed 20 British wounded 200–1,000 Hessian casualties (disputed - see Aftermath)

This combat engagement fought (Friday, October 18, 1776), is variously known in American, British, and Hessian sources as the Battle of Pelham, Battle of Pelham Manor, Battle of Pell's Neck, Battle of Rodman's Neck, Battle of Pell's Point, or by other geographically related names. This day-long action was fought by American, British and Hessian troops during the New York and New Jersey campaign of the American Revolutionary War. The conflict took place in an area of the Manor of Pelham, covering what is now part of Pelham Bay Park (namely the Split Rock Golf Course and Pelham Bay Golf Course) in the Bronx, New York City, and culminating in what today are the communities of Pelham Manor, Pelham and New Rochelle in Westchester County, New York.

On Saturday, October 12, British forces landed at Throgs Neck in order to execute a flanking maneuver that would trap Gen. George Washington, commander-in-chief of the American revolutionary forces, and the main body of the Continental Army on the island of Manhattan. The Americans were able to contain the British on Throg's Neck, and Gen. Sir William Howe, commander-in-chief of British land forces in North America, and his brother, Admiral Richard Lord Howe, commander of British naval forces, looked for another location along Long Island Sound to disembark the troops. On Friday, October 18, Howe landed an Advance Guard (Avant Gardde) of 4,000 men under General Sir Henry Clinton at Pell's Neck Pelham, 3 miles (4.8 km) northeast of Throgs Neck. Inland were 750 men of a brigade under the command of the American Colonel John Glover. Glover positioned his troops behind a series of stone walls and engaged the British advance as they attempted to move forward. As the British overran each position, the American troops fell back and reorganized behind the next wall. After several such assaults by the British 1st Light Infantry Battalion, the British and Hessian Grenadiers, masked by the rolling terrain, advanced upon the flank to turn the Americans from their positions. This movement ultimately led to an American withdrawal; confidently marching from the field in good order.

The battle delayed British movements long enough for Washington to continue moving the main army to White Plains and avoid being surrounded on Manhattan. After losing to the British in a battle at White Plains, and losing Fort Washington, Washington retreated across New Jersey to Pennsylvania.

== Background ==
After a victory at the Battle of Long Island in late August, the commander-in-chief of British land forces in North America, Gen. Sir William Howe landed his troops at Kip's Bay, on the eastern shore of present-day Manhattan, on September 15. George Washington and his army retreated to Harlem Heights, a plateau situated on the north end of Manhattan Island. Washington was in a good defensive position, with his rear guarded on two sides by rocky heights and the Hudson and Harlem Rivers, and with more rocky heights to the south between his forces and the British. The next day, the British attacked the Americans and were defeated at the Battle of Harlem Heights. There was very little action for the next month, while the two forces remained in their fortified positions, each unable to decide upon their next move. The Americans believed Howe would either attack Fort Washington or attempt to flank the Americans with a landing at some point on Long Island Sound. A council-of-war decided to guard against both possibilities; Washington kept 10,000 men to defend Harlem Heights and Fort Washington, while Maj. Gen. William Heath took 10,000 troops to defend the strategic King's Bridge, and Maj. Gen. Nathanael Greene was given 5,000 troops to defend the other side of the Hudson River, near Fort Constitution. After 26 days of contemplation, Howe decided against a frontal attack on Harlem Heights and Fort Washington and chose instead to attempt a flanking maneuver. The subsequent military engagement at Westchester Creek became known as the Battle of Throgs Neck (or Throg's Point).

On Saturday, October 12, leaving behind three brigades under the command of Lord Hugh Percy on Manhattan Island, Howe embarked his main army in 80 vessels and proceeded up the East River, through Hell Gate, and landed at Throgs Neck. Throgs Neck—originally known as Throckmorton's, and also known as Throggs, Throck's, Frog's Neck, and Frog's Point—is a narrow spit of land that sits between the East River and Long Island Sound. Conveniently for Howe, there was a road running from Throgs Neck to King's Bridge, directly behind the American forces. Howe hoped to use this road to flank the Americans and pin them against the Hudson River. Under the cover of fog, an advance force of 4,000 men under the command of General Henry Clinton was landed on Throgs Neck. To their dismay, they found they were not on a peninsula, but on an island, separated from the mainland by a creek and a marsh. There were two ways to get to the mainland: a causeway and bridge at the lower end, and a ford at the other. The Americans were guarding both. Col. Edward Hand and a detachment of 25 to 30 men from the 1st Pennsylvania Regiment positioned themselves behind a length of cordwood along the causeway, while the planks of wood from the bridge were removed by a corporal’s guard headed by Major William Stephens Smith. They surprised the British troops, who fell back and made an attempt to cross at the ford, which was guarded by another detachment. The Americans guarding both positions were quickly reinforced, and the defenders soon numbered over 1,800 men. Howe decided it would be better to retreat and land somewhere else. In his seminal work, Westchester County during the American Revolution, 1775-1783, historian Otto Hufeland writes:

The detention for several hours, of four thousand British provided with ample artillery, by twenty-five Americans behind piles of loose cordwood, demonstrates not only the bravery of these riflemen, but the weakness of the British command. The possession of the road to King's Bridge would not necessarily have meant the destruction of the American army at once, but the probability of its escape was remote, and success for the British would have ended the war.

As it was, Howe made camp on Throgs Neck and remained there for six days while supplies and reinforcements, including 7,000 Hessian soldiers under the command of Gen. Wilhelm von Knyphausen, were brought up from New York. Just after midnight on Friday, October 18, Howe embarked his army again and decided to land at Pell's Point near the town of Pelham, a few miles to the north.

After hearing of the landing on Throgs Neck, Washington knew he risked entrapment on Manhattan. He made the decision to move his army to White Plains, where he believed they would be safe. By Thursday, October 17, the Continental Army was on its way to White Plains, leaving behind 2,000 men to garrison Fort Washington.

== Battle ==
Statue of Glover on Commonwealth Avenue, Boston

At dawn, the British began to land on the shore, Clinton's advance guard of 4,000 British light infantry and Hessian jägers landing first. Inland, opposing them, were four regiments of some 750 men under the command of John Glover. Glover was atop a hill with a telescope when he noticed the British ships. Glover sent an officer, Major William Lee, to report to Charles Lee, Washington's second in command, and ask for orders. However, Lee did not give any orders, and in the absence of orders Glover chose to attack. Glover took command of the four regiments, which consisted of his own 14th, the 13th under the command of Colonel Joseph Read, the 3rd Continental Regiment under the command of Colonel William Shepard, and the 26th Continental Regiment under the command of Colonel Loammi Baldwin. Glover placed the 150 men of the 14th Continentals to the rear to prevent the British from outflanking the other regiments. Glover had not closed half the distance when he ran into approximately British advance guard. Glover ordered a Captain and his 40-man company forward as an advance guard to hold the British in check, while Glover organized the rest of the force.

Glover prepared an ambush by placing the three regiments under Read, Shepard, and Baldwin in staggered positions behind the stone walls that lined either side of the road leading from the beachhead to the interior. Glover instructed each of the regiments to hold their position as long as they could and then to fall back to a position in the rear, while the next unit took up the fighting. Glover then rode up to take command of the advance guard. The advance guard and the British began to engage each other, both sides taking casualties. After a little while the British were reinforced, and Glover ordered a retreat, which was done without confusion. The British troops began to advance at the retreating Americans. However, the 200 troops of the 13th Continentals that Glover had stationed behind the stone wall stood up and fired at the British when there were only 30 yards away. The ambush worked, and the column of British troops took heavy losses and fell back to the main body of the invading army.

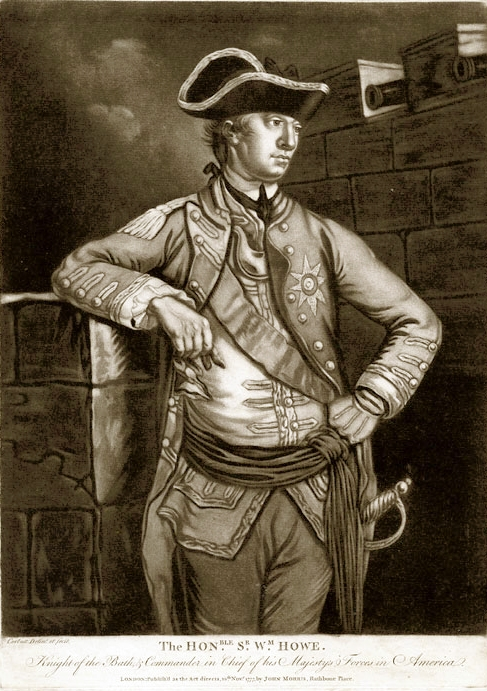
William Howe, leader of the British force at the Battle of Pell's Point

The British waited half an hour before attacking again. This time when they attacked, they attacked with all 4,000 men and seven cannon. The British bombarded the American position behind the stone wall as their infantry advanced. The cannon fire was ineffective, and when the British were 50 yards away the Americans fired a volley which stopped the British infantry. The British returned fire, and musket and rifle fire ensued for 20 minutes, the British supported by cannon, at which point the lead American regiment fell back under cover of the next reserve regiment. The 3rd Continental Regiment was stationed behind the stone wall on the opposite side of the road.

The British attacked the position of the 3rd Continentals, and an engagement ensued. Both sides kept up constant fire, the Americans breaking the British lines several times. However, after 17 volleys, the British numbers began to overwhelm the Americans, and Glover ordered a withdrawal to another stone wall while the next regiment in line, the 26th Continentals, engaged the British.

A reconnaissance party of 30 men was sent out from behind the third stone wall to see if the British would try and flank the American position. The party ran into the British, who had continued to advance, and they fell back to the stone wall. The Americans behind the wall fired one volley before Glover gave the order to retreat. The Americans retreated about a mile north and crossed a bridge over the Hutchinson stream, their retreat covered by the 150 men of the 14th Continentals who engaged in an artillery duel with the British. Howe's army camped on the opposite side of the stream but made no attempt to cross the stream.

== Aftermath ==
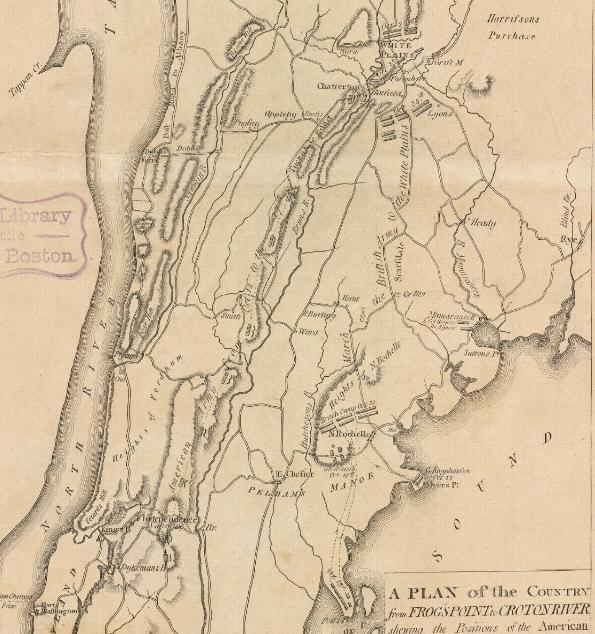
The British movements from Pell's Point to White Plains

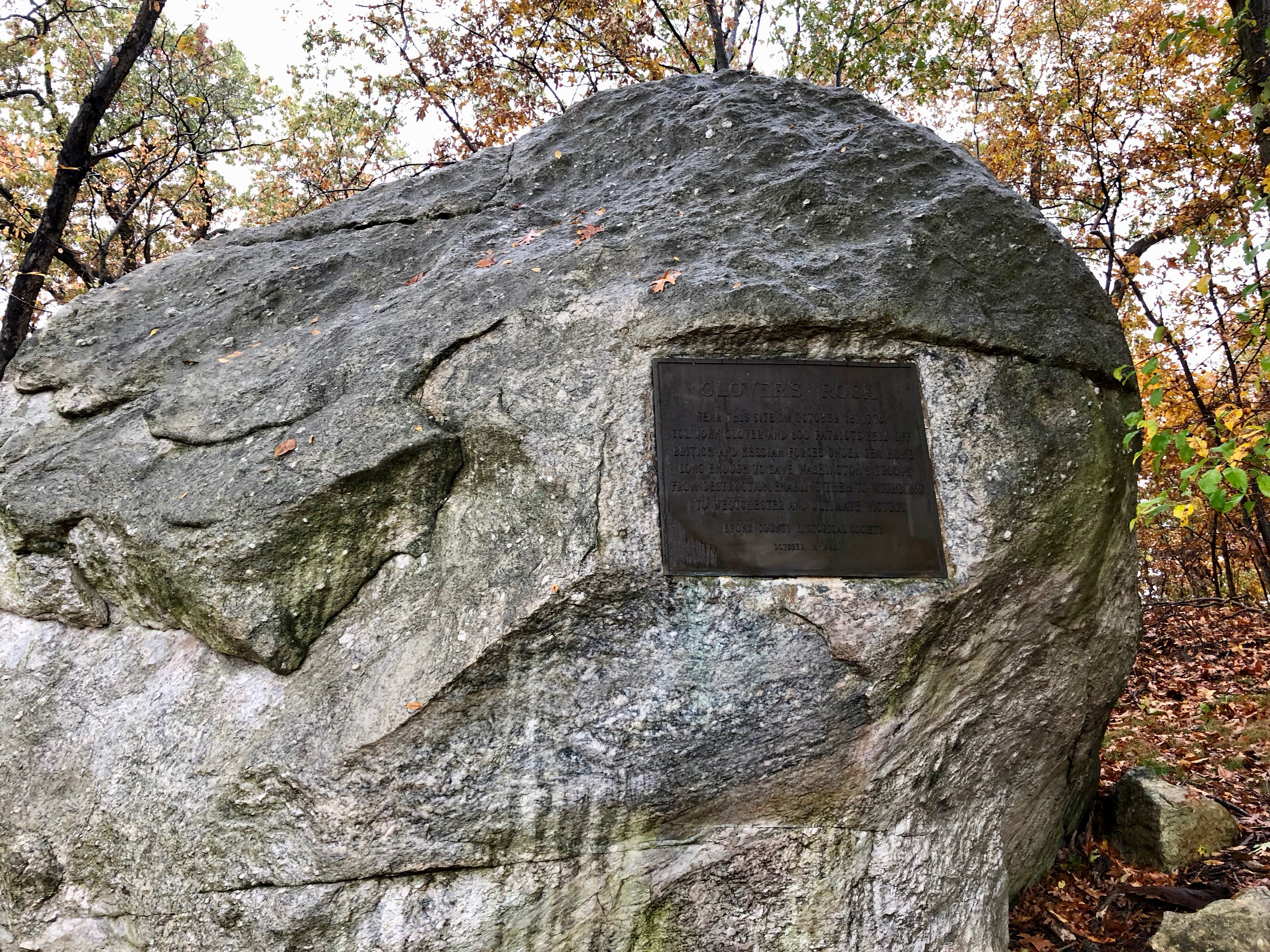
Glover's Rock in Pelham Bay Park, with a plaque commemorating the Battle of Pell's Point

The next day, Glover and his force retreated to the town of Yonkers. American casualties were 8 killed and 13 wounded. British and Hessian casualties are not known. Howe's official dispatch listed British casualties as 3 killed and 20 wounded, although the report did not include Hessian casualties. As the Hessians made up the majority of the landing force, it is reasonable to expect they made up the majority of the casualties. Over the next few days, from knowledge collected from British deserters, the Americans estimated that the British lost between 800 and 1,000 killed or wounded, likely an exaggeration. Colonel Loammi Baldwin, (an officer and fruit fancier whose fame came in the Baldwin apple) who was present at the battle, estimated that the Americans had killed 200 British and Hessians, but historian David McCullough says this was "undoubtedly an exaggeration." Historian George Athan Billias argues in support of Baldwin's estimates, due in part to the corroborating admission of another British deserter. Regardless, the combined British and Hessian casualties were almost certainly larger than those of the Americans.

The nearby Church of Eastchester (which would later become Saint Paul's Church National Historic Site) served as a field hospital for the Americans prior to the battle and possibly for Hessian troops in the days following the battle. According to the National Park Service brochure for the site, "ninety men died the first night in the church and were buried in a sandpit in the churchyard." A mass grave for five Hessian soldiers was discovered more than a century later when new graves were being dug, and a memorial marker was added in 1910. Records identified them as five specific privates from the Regiment von Knyphausen. It is likely that there are many more soldier graves in the cemetery than those currently identified.

With the British advance delayed, the main American army under Washington was able to safely evacuate from Harlem (on the island of Manhattan) to White Plains. Howe slowly moved his army through New Rochelle and Scarsdale. On Monday, October 28, he sent 13,000 men to attack the Americans, resulting in a victory over Washington at the Battle of White Plains. Fort Washington, the last American stronghold on Manhattan, fell on November 16. With these defeats, Washington and his army retreated across New Jersey and into Pennsylvania, paving the way for the Battles of Trenton and Princeton.

== See also ==
- American Revolutionary War §British New York counter-offensive. The 'Battle of Pell's Point' placed in overall sequence and strategic context.
- Saint Paul's Church National Historic Site
- Pelham Bay Park

== Bibliography ==
- Abbatt, William (1901). The Battle of Pell's Point. New York: University of California. "Battle of Pell's Point."
- Billias, George Athan (1960). General John Glover and his Marblehead Mariners. New York: Holt, Rinehart and Winston.
- McCullough, David (2006). 1776. New York: Simon and Schuster Paperback. ISBN 0-7432-2672-0. "1776 David."
- Ward, Christopher (1952). The War of the Revolution, Volume 1. New York: The Macmillan Company.
- Hufeland, Otto (1973). Westchester County During the American Revolution, 1775-1783. New York: Harbor Hill Books.
- Stiles, Ezra (1901). The Literary Diary of Ezra Stiles (note: future President of Yale). New York: Charles Scribner & Sons.
