= Statue of John Glover =

Statue in Boston, Massachusetts, U.S.

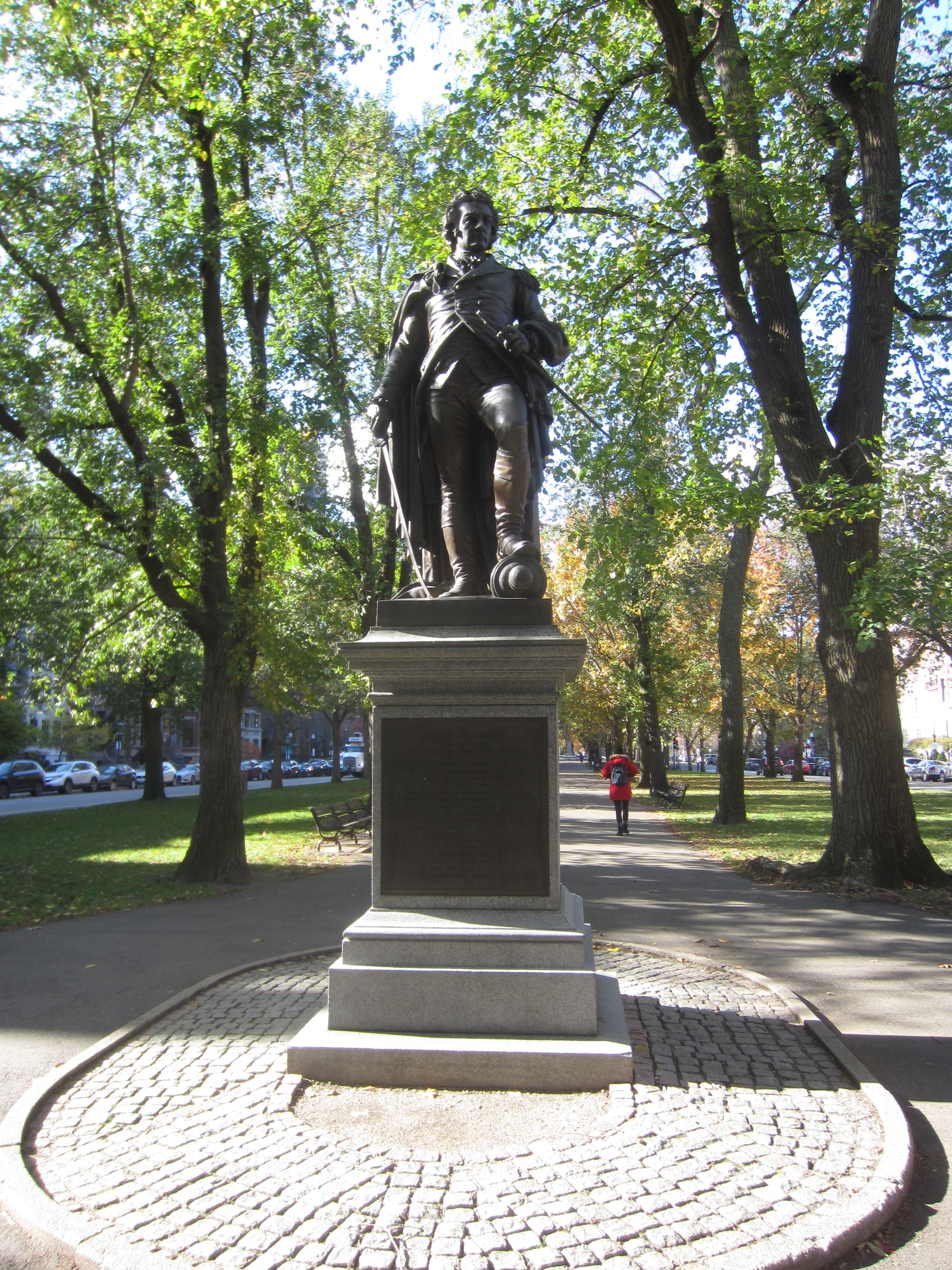
- The statue in 2019
- Artist: Martin Milmore
- Year: 1875
- Subject: John Glover
- Location: Boston, Massachusetts, U.S.; 42°21′10.2″N 71°4′28.8″W

A statue of John Glover by Martin Milmore is installed along Boston's Commonwealth Avenue Mall, in the U.S. state of Massachusetts.

== Description ==
The bronze sculpture of the Continental Army brigadier general measures approximately 8 ft. x 3 ft. 6 in. x 3 ft. 6 in., and rests on a granite base that measures approximately 6 ft. 6 in. x 5 ft. 6 in. x 5 ft. 6 in.

== History ==
It was completed in 1875. The work was surveyed as part of the Smithsonian Institution's "Save Outdoor Sculpture!" program in 1993.

== Reception ==
The sculpture was met with an indifferent reception in the 19th century. William H. Downes complained that it was "rather showy and theatrical, and comes near to being bombastic in its effect."
