= General John Glover House =

Historic house in Massachusetts, United States

- U.S. National Register of Historic Places
- U.S. National Historic Landmark
- U.S. Historic district – Contributing property
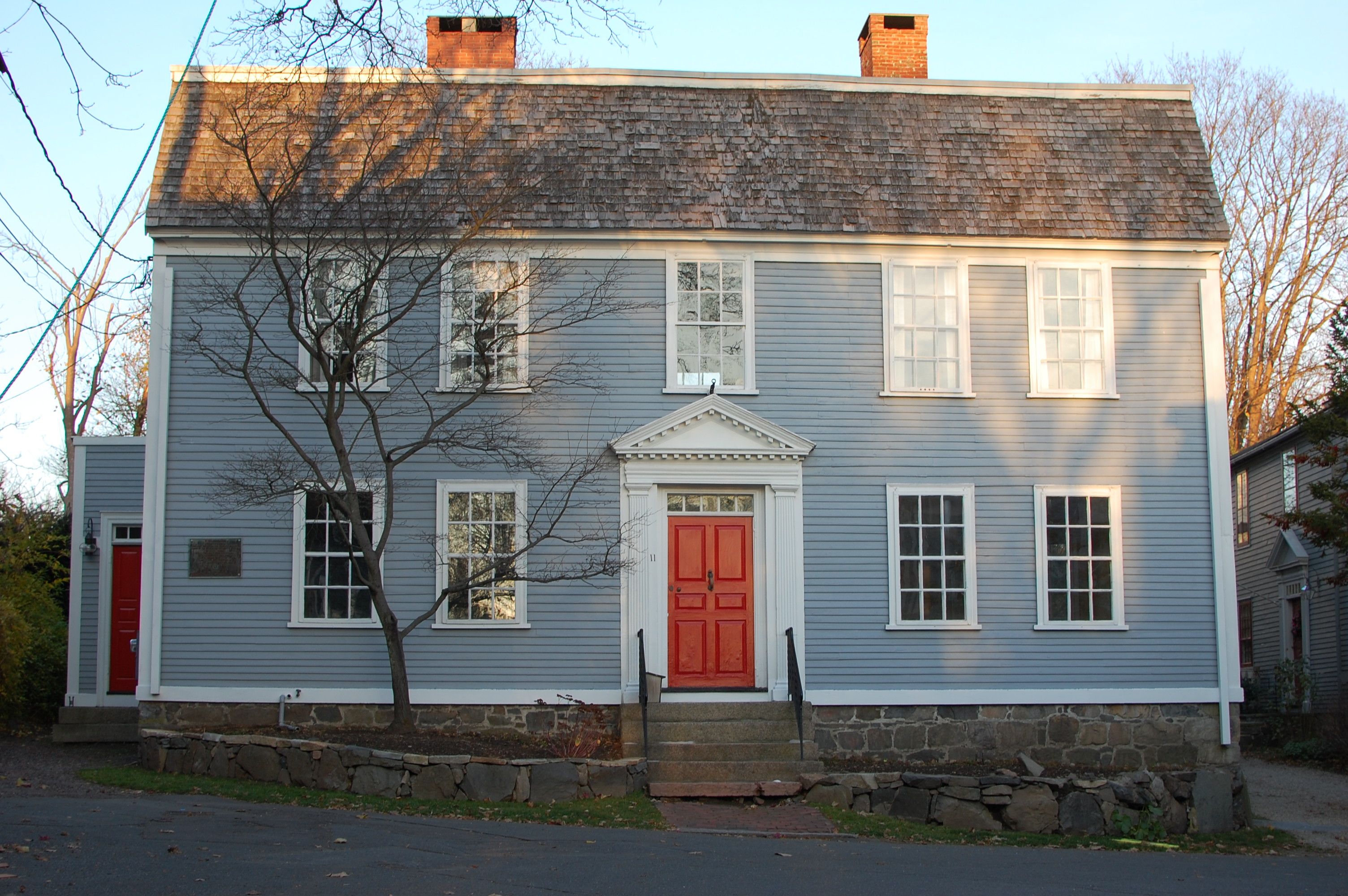
- General John Glover House, 11 Glover Square

- Location within Massachusetts Location within the United States
- Location: Marblehead, Massachusetts
- Coordinates: 42°30′19″N 70°50′51″W
- Area: less than one acre
- Built: 1762
- Part of: Marblehead Historic District (ID84002402)
- NRHP reference No.: 72001101

Significant dates
- Added to NRHP: November 28, 1972
- Designated CP: January 10, 1984

The General John Glover House is a National Historic Landmark at 11 Glover Square in Marblehead, Massachusetts. It is a 2 1/2-story gambrel-roofed colonial built in 1762 by John Glover (1732–1797), a local merchant, politician, and militia leader who gained fame for his military leadership in the American Revolutionary War. The house was declared a National Historic Landmark and added to the National Register of Historic Places in 1972, for its association with Glover, who lived here during the war years.

== Description and history ==
The Glover House is a 2 1/2-story wood-frame structure, five bays wide, with a gambrel roof and two symmetrically placed interior chimneys. A two-story kitchen ell extends to the rear of the house. The front entry is centered on the west-facing main facade, with a four-light transom window above, and is framed by pilasters and pediment with entablature. The inside of the house is a variant of the typical Georgian center-hall plan, with a single large parlor on the right, and a smaller dining room on the left, behind which is a hallway opening to a secondary stairwell and side door. The parlor and dining room have elaborately carved fireplace surrounds, and the parlor also has a carved wooden cornice. The upstairs has three bedrooms.

John Glover was born in Salem, Massachusetts in 1732, moved to nearby Marblehead early in his life, and rose to become a merchant of wealth and substance. He joined the local militia in 1759. In 1762 he built this house, which became his home until 1782. By the time the American Revolutionary War broke out in 1775, Glover had already been active in resistance activities. He quickly rose in importance in the Continental Army, providing marine logistics during the New York and New Jersey campaign of 1776–77. He notably oversaw the transport of the Continental forces from a besieged position on August 29–30, 1776, after they lost the Battle of Long Island, without any significant losses, and was again involved in the same role in Washington's crossing of the Delaware River on the night of December 25–26, which preceded the Battle of Trenton. Promoted to brigadier general after these actions, he led a division in the Battles of Saratoga in September and October 1777. He was given a brevet promotion to major general at the end of the conflict.

In 1782 Glover purchased the Marblehead estate of the Loyalist William Browne, which had been confiscated by the state. That house and farm served as his home until his death in 1796. The Glover Farm house and property still stands, but has been significantly altered having been converted into an Inn and then later restaurant before closing in the later 1990s. Glover continued to be active in local affairs, and served in the Massachusetts convention which ratified the United States Constitution in 1788.

The property was designated a National Historic Landmark and listed on the National Register of Historic Places in 1972, and was included in the Marblehead Historic District in 1984.

== See also ==
- National Register of Historic Places listings in Essex County, Massachusetts
- List of National Historic Landmarks in Massachusetts
