= Glover House (Quincy, Massachusetts) =

Historic house in Massachusetts, United States

- U.S. National Register of Historic Places
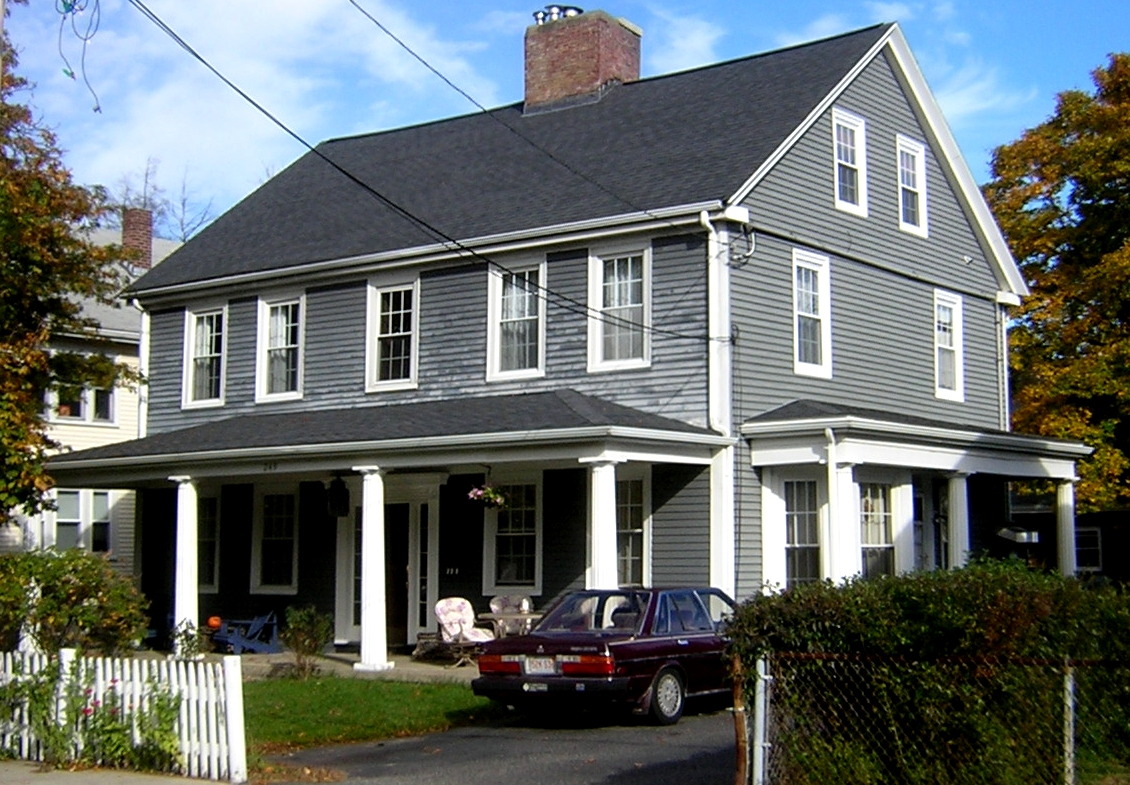

- Location within Massachusetts Location within the United States
- Location: 249 E. Squantum St., Quincy, Massachusetts
- Coordinates: 42°17′0.5″N 71°1′27.5″W
- Area: 0.2 acres (0.081 ha)
- Built: 1798
- Architectural style: Federal
- MPS: Quincy MRA
- NRHP reference No.: 89001328
- Added to NRHP: September 20, 1989

The Glover House is a historic house located at 249 East Squantum Street in Quincy, Massachusetts.

== Description and history ==
The 2 1/2-story timber-framed house was built in 1798, and is one of Quincy's few well-preserved Federal style houses. An addition was added to the rear in the late 19th century, and a Greek Revival style porch and door surround were added (the latter replacing an earlier Federal surround). The land the house was built on was in the Glover family for 280 years.

The house was listed on the National Register of Historic Places on September 20, 1989.

== See also ==
- National Register of Historic Places listings in Quincy, Massachusetts
