= Jeremiah Lee Mansion =

Historic house in Massachusetts, United States

- Jeremiah Lee House
- U.S. National Register of Historic Places
- U.S. National Historic Landmark
- U.S. Historic district – Contributing property
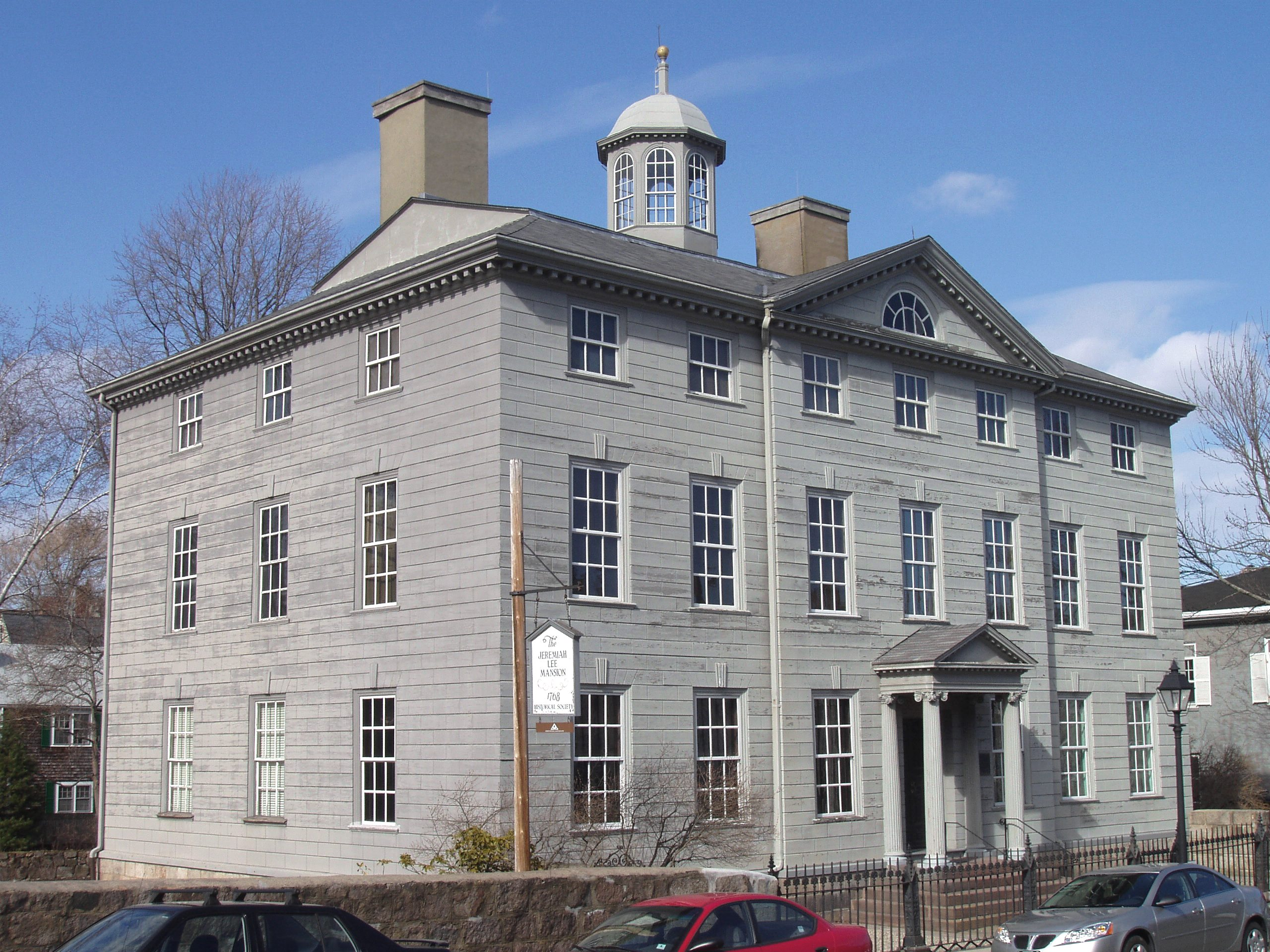
- The Jeremiah Lee Mansion

- Location within Massachusetts Location within the United States
- Location: 161 Washington Street, Marblehead, Massachusetts
- Coordinates: 42°30′12″N 70°51′6″W
- Built: 1768
- Architectural style: Georgian
- Part of: Marblehead Historic District (ID84002402)
- NRHP reference No.: 66000766

Significant dates
- Added to NRHP: October 15, 1966
- Designated NHL: October 9, 1960
- Designated CP: January 10, 1984

The Jeremiah Lee Mansion is a historic house located in Marblehead, Massachusetts. It is operated as a house museum by the local historical society. Built in 1768, it was designated a National Historic Landmark in 1960 as one of the finest Late Georgian houses in the United States. It features original wallpaper and finely crafted woodwork.

== Description ==
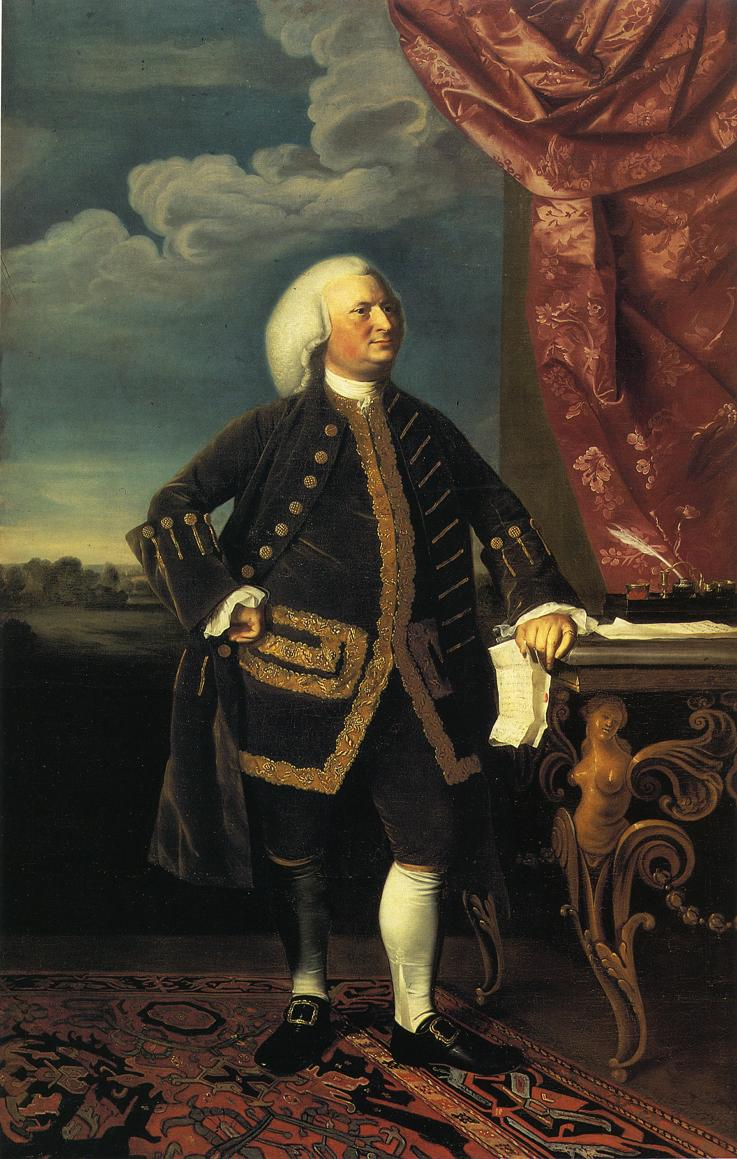
Jeremiah Lee, oil on canvas, John Singleton Copley, 1769. Wadsworth Atheneum

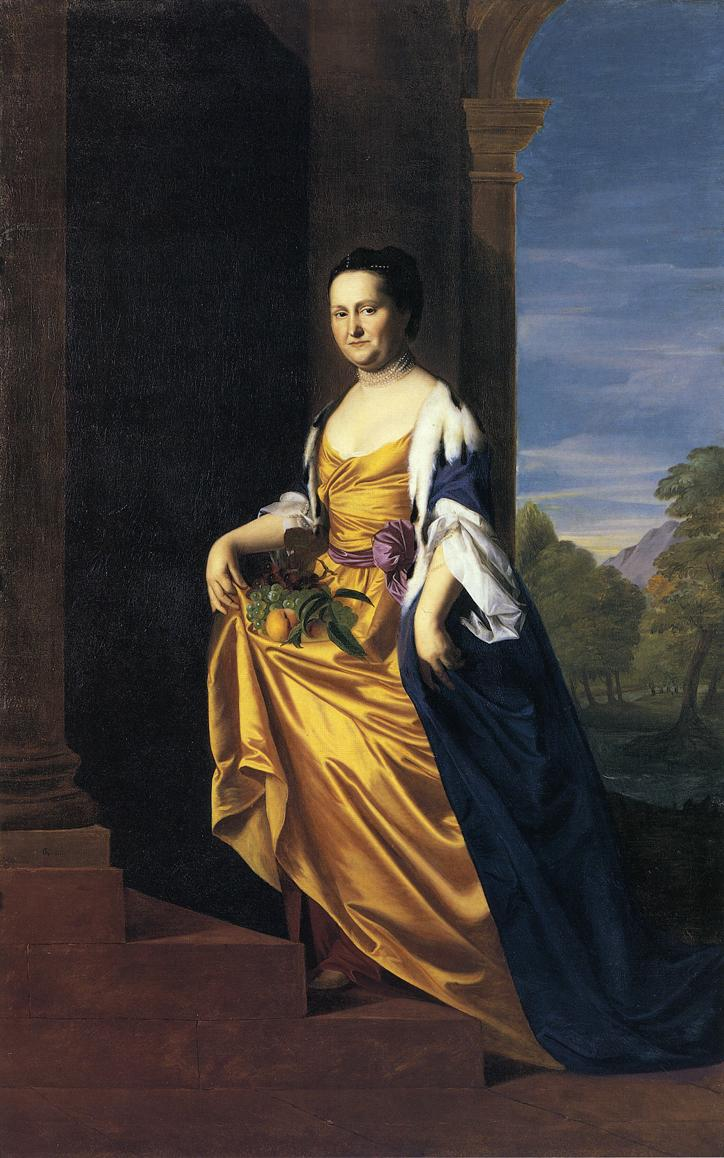
Mrs. Jeremiah Lee, oil on canvas, John Singleton Copley, c. 1769. Wadsworth Atheneum

The mansion is a large wooden house in the Georgian style, with an imitation stone ashlar facade, built in 1768 by Colonel Jeremiah Lee, at that time the wealthiest merchant and ship owner in the Province of Massachusetts Bay. The facade may be based on Plate 11 of Robert Morris' influential patternbook Rural Architecture (London 1750; retitled Select Architecture in later eds.). It was one of the largest and most opulent houses of the late-colonial period in America.

The mansion is now owned by the Marblehead Museum and Historical Society. It contains a notable collection of early American furniture, and many of the mansion's original decorative finishes have been preserved, including rare 18th-century English hand-painted wallpaper, intricate carving in the rococo style, and a grand entry hall and staircase paneled with mahogany. On either side of its landing are copies of the full-length portraits of Jeremiah and Martha Lee by John Singleton Copley.

The mansion was declared a National Historic Landmark and listed on the National Register of Historic Places in 1966. In 1984 it was also included in the Marblehead Historic District.

== See also ==
- National Register of Historic Places listings in Essex County, Massachusetts
- List of National Historic Landmarks in Massachusetts
- List of historic houses in Massachusetts
