= Saint Paul's Church National Historic Site =

Church in Mount Vernon, New York

- St. Paul's Church National Historic Site
- U.S. National Register of Historic Places
- U.S. National Historic Site
- New York State Register of Historic Places
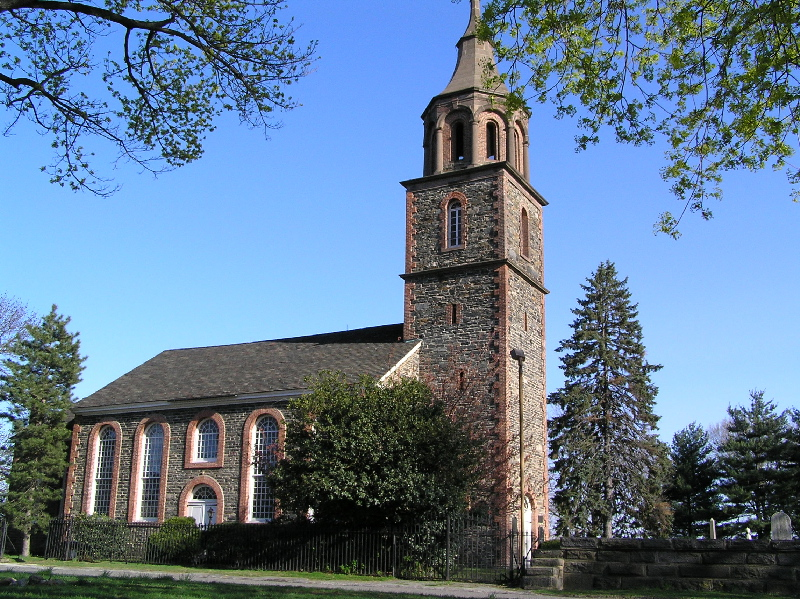

- Location within New York City Location within New York Location within the United States
- Location: 897 South Columbus Avenue, Eastchester, Mount Vernon, New York
- Coordinates: 40°53′34″N 73°49′33″W
- Area: 6 acres (2.4 ha)
- Built: 1765
- Architectural style: Georgian
- Visitation: 11,615 (2023)
- Website: Saint Paul's Church National Historic Site
- NRHP reference No.: 66000580
- NYSRHP No.: 11941.000001

Significant dates
- Added to NRHP: October 15, 1966
- Designated NHS: July 5, 1943
- Designated NYSRHP: June 23, 1980

Saint Paul's Church National Historic Site is a church and National Historic Site in Mount Vernon, New York, just north of the New York City borough of the Bronx. Established in 1765, Saint Paul's Church is one of New York's oldest parishes and was used as a military hospital after the American Revolutionary War Battle of Pell's Point in 1776. The 5-acre (20,000 m^{2}) cemetery surrounding the church contains an estimated 9,000 burials. The church and cemetery were designated as a United States National Historic Site in 1978 to protect them from increasing industrialization of the surrounding area.

== History ==
The parish that founded Saint Paul's Church was established in 1665. The first church at the site was a small, square, wooden structure built in 1695 and was known as the Church of Eastchester. (The area was then part of the village of Eastchester, New York.) The present-day church was built in 1764, but its name was not changed to Saint Paul's Church until 1795.

=== Election of 1733 ===
The election for an open seat in the New York General Assembly, held on October 29, 1733, on the village green adjacent to the Church of Eastchester, is one of the better known political events in colonial America. The first issue of John Peter Zenger's New-York Weekly Journal carried a lengthy report on the highly contested election, producing one of the few complete accounts of a colonial election available to historians. This and Zenger's subsequent publications led to his 1735 trial for libel. Zenger's acquittal in the trial is seen as a foundation of the freedom of the press in America.

=== Battle of Pell's Point field hospital ===
On October 18, 1776, the Revolutionary War Battle of Pell's Point was fought less than a mile from the church, and the church served as a field hospital for the Hessian troops following the battle. Earlier, the church briefly served as a Continental Army field hospital for sick soldiers pulled out of their posts in September and October 1776.

=== The Cemetery ===
St. Paul's cemetery contains a mass grave for at least five Hessian soldiers who died while being treated at the Hessian field hospital. It also contains graves of several identified Revolutionary War veterans who served in the Continental Army and in the local Patriot militia, as well as "many unknown" soldiers who died either on the battlefield or in the church when it served as an American field hospital.

A section of the cemetery was later used by Mount Vernon as a potter's field.

=== The Building ===
The present-day church, built in 1764, was constructed of local stone and brick, following the 18th-century English style with its rectangular frame, arched windows, and bell tower. However, it broke from tradition in its layout. While English churches typically placed the entrance at one end and the altar at the other, St. Paul’s—like many American Colonial churches—positioned its main door and pulpit on opposite long walls.

=== The Church Bell ===
The church's bell tower contains a bell that was cast in 1758 at the same Whitechapel Bell Foundry in London as the Liberty Bell. Local stories attest that George Washington ordered the parishioners to bury the bell to prevent the British from melting it down and using it for ammunition. By the 1870s, the small St. Paul’s bell became well known nationwide as a "junior partner" to the famous Philadelphia bell. Due to its smaller weight (approximately 800 pounds), which made it relatively easy to handle, it was periodically removed and transported to various places across America for special occasions. It was displayed at the World Cotton Centennial in 1884-1885 and at the Chicago World's Fair of 1893. During both World War I and World War II, it was again taken around the country and rung at War Bond rallies as a surrogate for the Liberty Bell.

The bell still hangs in the tower today. It is rung on important ceremonial occasions, including 13 times on Independence Day.

=== 20th century and beyond ===
During the 20th century, the parish began to decline as the area became increasingly industrial. In 1942, as part of an effort to revitalize the congregation and draw attention to the site's historical significance, the interior of the church was restored to its 18th-century appearance, based on the original pew plan of 1787. A committee chaired by Sara Delano Roosevelt, mother of President Franklin D. Roosevelt, raised funds for the project. (She was a direct descendant of Anne Hutchinson, who had lived and died in close proximity to the church's location in the 1640s.) Despite the effort, the parish continued to decline; the last Sunday service held at Saint Paul's took place in May 1977.

The church (along with its carriage house, cemetery, and grounds) was designated as a National Historic Site on July 5, 1943, although not formally authorized until November 10, 1978. In 1980, the site was transferred from the Episcopal Dioceses of New York to the National Park Service. Today, visitors can visit the church and the church tower on ranger-guided tours. The carriage house next to the church now serves as a museum and visitor center. The site was opened to the public in 1984 and is now operated by the National Park Service under a cooperative agreement with the Society of the National Shrine of the Bill of Rights at Saint Paul's Church, Eastchester.

Richard Shute's 1704 gravestone is known as the oldest dated gravestone in Westchester County. In 2004, the 300-year-old stone fell over. It was removed from the cemetery and placed inside the building for safekeeping, positioned on a small wooden platform.

== African American legacy ==
This site was added to the African American Heritage Trail of Westchester County in 2004 as part of a mission to “preserve and interpret the legacy and contributions that people of African descent have made to the development of our unique American identity.” A significant number of people buried in the church's cemetery are of African descent.

== See also ==
- National Register of Historic Places listings in southern Westchester County, New York
- List of National Historic Landmarks in New York
