= Glover School =

School in Massachusetts, United States of America

Coordinates: 42°29′24.10″N 70°52′48.59″W

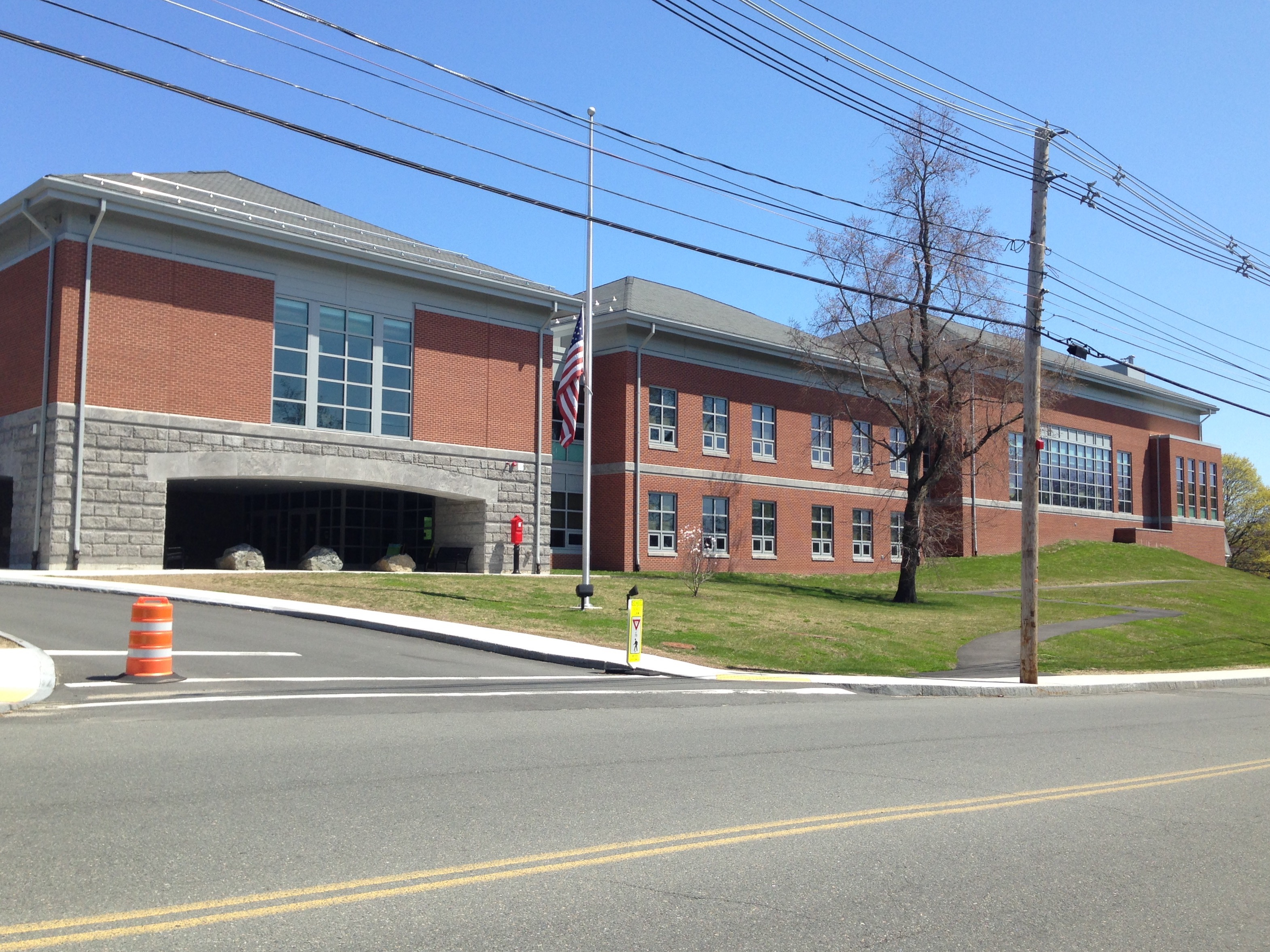

Information
- Grades: K-3
- Enrollment: c.425

Glover School is a public elementary school on Maple Street in Marblehead, Massachusetts, US. It educates around 250 students in grades K-3. The school consists of two buildings situated on a hilly 4.78-acre (19,300 m^{2}) site.

== History ==
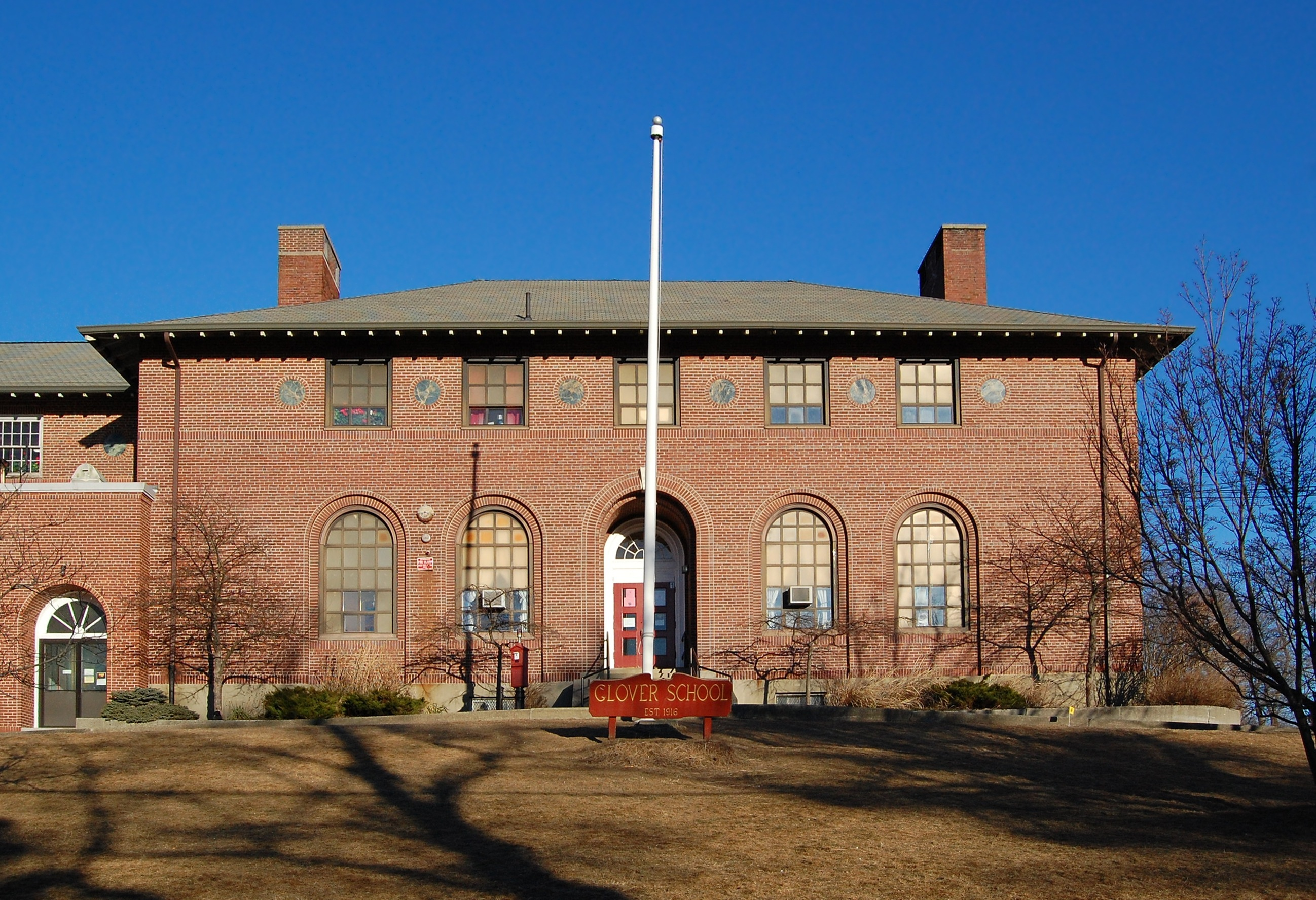
The former Glover School before it was demolished

The school was designed by architect Walter S. Brodie. It consists of two buildings. The 'lower building' was built in 1916 and the 'upper building' in 1948.

In May 1999 the community debated the cost of repairs to Glover School.

In mid-2012 both buildings were demolished so that a new Glover School could be built in their place. School officials said the original buildings were antiquated and hard to maintain. The new building will have modern utilities and will add a kindergarten, increasing total enrollment to 425 students.

== Academics ==
The approach at Glover to Mathematics teaching was discussed in November 2001. The school currently uses the GoMath Program.

== Murder of teacher ==
On November 27, 1950, Beryl Atherton a teacher at the school, was found at her home with her throat slashed. The murder remains unsolved.

== Notable alumni ==
- Keith Ablow, former psychiatrist, pundit and talk show host.
