= List of mango cultivars =

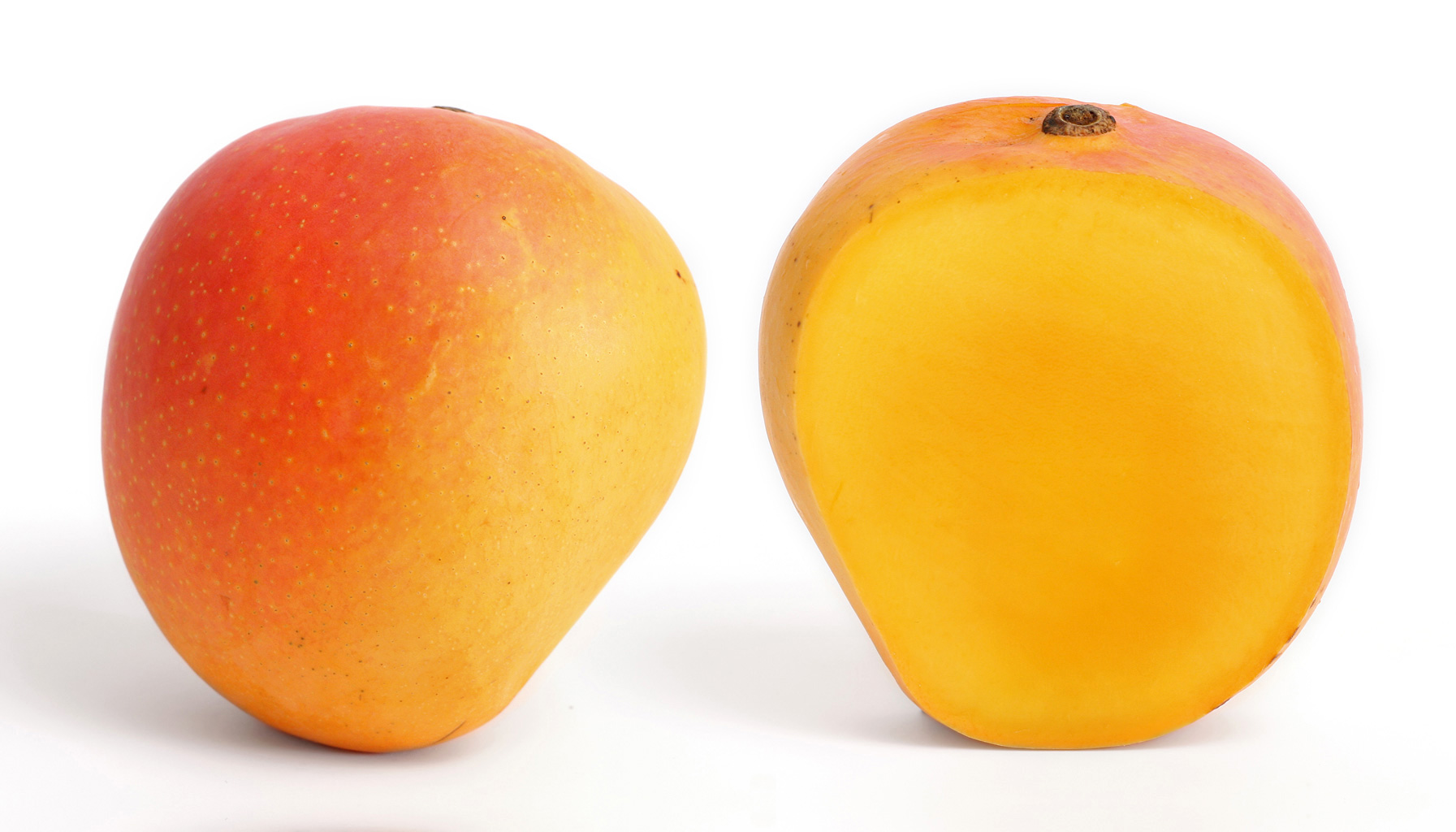
Mangos of the Kensington Pride cultivar

The following is a list of some prominent mango cultivars. Worldwide, hundreds of mango cultivars are known.

Most commercial cultivars belong to Mangifera indica, while a few commercial varieties grown in Southeast Asia belong to other Mangifera species. Southeast Asia, India, Australia, the United States and some African countries cultivate locally selected varieties, while most other countries grow cultivars developed in Florida.

== Table of mangoes ==
The United States Department of Agriculture (USDA) facility on Old Cutler Road in Coral Gables, Florida, has about 400 varieties of mangoes and is one of the largest depositories of mango plant cultures in the world.

The USDA collection was originally believed to have over 500 varieties of mango germplasm, but genetic testing showed several duplicates. In the United States, South Florida is one of the centers for mangoes due to year-round temperate climate and culture fascinated by mangoes and several nurseries dedicated to bringing new varieties of mangoes into the US by either import or selective breeding.

The Indian Council of Agricultural Research (ICAR) has developed, evaluated, and conserved hundreds of mango varieties across its institutes. Some of the hybrids developed are Mallika, Amrapali, Vanraj etc. ICAR continuously catalogues the ~1,000 diverse mango varieties grown across India.

Reviews of older varieties of mangoes were based on the competition available at the time. Most of the varieties of mangoes available in grocery stores in the United States can trace their lineage to the Haden mango tree, a tree planted by Jack Haden in 1902 in Coral Gables, Florida (Haden itself can be traced back to Malgova which is misspelled Malgoba in the US and has its origin in Tamil Nadu, India). The following are among the more widely grown mango cultivars, listed by the country in which they were selected or are most extensively cultivated:

Common name(s)	Image	Origin/ region	Notes
Alampur Baneshan		India	The fruit is medium-sized with thin skin, ranging in color from green to yellow. The flesh of the ripe fruit is fiberless, ranging in color from yellow to golden-yellow to orange-yellow. As far as taste is concerned, it gives a slightly tart flavour.
Alice		United States	
Alphonso		India	Sweet with fibreless pulp found mainly in Raigad & Ratnagiri Districts of Maharashtra, India. This cultivar is available from February till the end of May. The dates of availability of mangoes vary by geography, climate, and weather.
Amrapali		India	Cross between Dasheri and Neelum mangoes. Considered among the better tasting mangoes with a strong aroma in its leaves. Fruits every year with no alternate bearing unlike other mangoes.
Anderson		United States	Anderson is a seedling of Sandersha that was planted in Miami, Florida. Anderson is a large mango, growing in length from 26 to 34 cm. [Mangoes: A Guide To Mangoes In Florida, p. 30] The eating quality was listed as "fair."
Angie		United States (Florida)	Angie mangoes are a dwarfing mango tree from Florida, rated highly for their taste. Angie has a resinous taste, similar to the Carrie mango. Angie is considered to be a disease-resistant mango, but in high humidity environments Angie's new leaf growth is susceptible to mango scab.
Anwar Ratol		Pakistan (Punjab), India (Uttar Pradesh)	Anwar Ratol is a small sized yellow in colour mango sometimes known as mini-sized power house available in the Punjab and Sindh regions of Pakistan. It is also available near Rataul village in Uttar Pradesh, India. It is highly sweet in taste, with few fibres.
Appemidi		India (Karnataka)	The mango is found in the wild and is small in size and pulpy. It is known for its taste, aroma and shelf life. It is used in the pickle industry.
Ataulfo		Brazil, Ecuador, Mexico	
Badami		India (Karnataka)	Badami mangoes are also known as the Alphonso of Karnataka state.
Bailey's Marvel		United States	
Banganapalli		India (Andhra Pradesh)	It originates from the erstwhile princely state of Banganapalle, in present-day Andhra Pradesh and remains the most produced cultivar in the state. It is obliquely oval in shape, around 20 cm in length, with yellow flesh and a thin, smooth yellow skin. The flesh has a firm, meaty texture and is sweet and lacks fibre.
Bangalora		India	It is also known as the Kilimooku mango
Bennet Alphonso		United States	
Beverly		United States	Beverly is an almost fiber-less late season mango, grown in South Florida, fruiting between August and October.
Black and Rose		India (Kerala)	Black and Rose
Bombay		Jamaica, United States	Bombay is a vigorous mango tree that bears fruit in June–July in South Florida. It is susceptible to anthracnose. Bombay is the parent of the White Perie mango of Hawaii.
Brahm Kai Meu		United States	
Brooks		Australia, United States	
Carabao (Philippine Mango)		Philippines	The Ataulfo and Manilita mango cultivars originated from the Philippine Mango variety. It can be traced back to the Manila-Mexico galleon trade in the years 1600–1800s.
Carrie		United States	Carrie is a seedling of Sophie Fry in Boynton Beach, Florida. The Carrie mango turns slightly yellow when ripe, but what it lacks in color, it makes up for in taste. The Carrie mango has a strong resinous flavor that is desired by some, and despised by others. A Carrie mango must be allowed to ripen on the tree and develop a strong "musky" flavor when over-ripe.
Casturi/kasturi		Indonesia (South Kalimantan)	
Chaunsa		India, Pakistan	Chaunsa (also referred to as 'Chausa') is a pale yellow, slightly green succulent variety of mango when near ripe. Closer to its ripening, the mango skin will become slightly wrinkly and soft to the touch. Chaunsa is harvested in the summer months (June–September).
Chinna rasalu		India (Nuzvid, Andhra Pradesh)	
Cherukurasamu		India (Nuzvid, Andhra Pradesh)	
Coconut Cream		United States	Coconut Cream is part of the selective breeding program by Zills High Performance and is patented. The fruit tastes like coconut cream pie. The branches of the tree grow in arcs and curve around, making a complex tree canopy.
Chok Anan		Pakistan, Bangladesh, India, Thailand	Choc Anan is known as the ever-bearing mango tree because of its potential to have a mango crop during the summer and winter. Some speculate that removing the summer crop may increase the chances of a winter crop by allowing the tree to save the energy that would have been used for fruit production in the summer.
Cogshall		United States	Cogshall is from Pine Island, Florida. It is an excellent eating quality, but is not commercially available because of a very short shelf-life and thin skin that would bruise easily.
Cushman		United States	
Dasheri		India, Nepal, Pakistan	It originated in Village Dasehri, Block Malihabad, Kakori, Lucknow, India. Grafts and propagations from a mother tree near Lucknow, Uttar Pradesh, India have been widely grown in North India, Nepal, Pakistan and as far south as Andhra Pradesh since the 18th century. An excellent quality mango, it is grown for export, and can be found in markets around Southeast Asia.
Dot		United States	Dot is an exceptionally tasting mango. Dot is a seedling of the Carrie Mango planted in Boynton Beach, Florida home. The dot mango is highly susceptible to anthracnose, so it should not be planted in high humidity locations.
Dudhiya Malda, Malda or Maldeo		Nepal, India (Bihar)	"Dudhia Malda" mango is a variant of Langra, grown in Digha, Patna district in India as well as Saptari and Siraha district of Nepal. Known for its distinctively sweet, thin skin, small seeds, low fiber, milky yellow pulp and a unique sweet aroma. It is referred Dudiya because once the skin of the mango is scratched milk-like liquid oozes out.
Duncan		United States	Duncan mango was patented by David Sturrock of West Palm Beach, Florida. The patent has long since expired. Duncan fruits in clusters and has excellent disease resistance. It is a mid-late season mango.
Earlygold		United States	
Edward		United States	Edward is an excellent eating quality mango, but is considered to be a shy bearer (little fruit).
Eldon		United States	
Emerald		United States	
Espada		Brazil	
Fazli (mango)		Bangladesh (Rajshahi), India	The "Fazli" mango is a mango cultivar primarily grown in Bangladesh. and Indian States of West Bengal. It is a late maturing fruit, available after other varieties. Fazlis are commonly used in jams and pickles in the cuisine of the Indian subcontinent. Each mango can be quite large, going up to a kilo. Rajshahi in Bangladesh is the major producers of Fazli.
Fajri Kalan		Pakistan	
Fairchild		United States	
Fascell		United States	
Florigon		United States	Florigon is a seedling of a Saigon planted on the property of John C. Kaiser, Fort Lauderdale, Florida. The Florigon tree is vigorous. Florigon is considered to be one of the most disease resistant varieties of mangoes in high humid climates, although the flavor is not on par with many of the newer varieties.
Ford		United States	
Gary		United States	The Gary mango is considered delicious by many with a hint of coconut flavor. Gary is considered very susceptible to anthracnose.
Gir Kesar		India	The Gir Keshar mango is famous for its colour and smell. Ripe fruit gives a world's best smell and taste. The taste and smell makes them expensive.
Glenn		Italy, United States	Glenn is a sweet, mild mango. The tree is vigorous, to a medium size. The canopy is rounded. The ripe fruit has a very pleasant sweet smell.
Golapkhas/Gulabkhas		India	
Goa Mankurad Mango		India (Goa)	This mango variety is a Goan summer staple, offering rich taste and a small flat seed. Weighing 200-250 grams, it has an unifom yellow skin, rich pulp, and balanced sweetness.
Gold Nugget		United States	
Golden Lippens		United States	
Graham		Trinidad	Graham is from Trinidad. Compared with many modern mangoes, Graham seems bland.
Green Willard		Sri Lanka, India	
Haden		India, Australia, Brazil, Costa Rica, Ecuador, Guatemala, Honduras, Mexico, United States	Haden is the "parent" of many other varieties of mangoes in the United States. Haden was a Mulgoba seedling. The original Haden tree still stands in Coral Gables, Florida.
Haribhanga		Bangladesh (Rangpur)	The Haribhanga mango is a mango cultivar produced in the northwest part of Bangladesh, especially in the Rangpur district. Cultivation of the Haribhanga mango has recently gained popularity among the farmers of northern districts. Locally called Haribhanga, these mangoes are round in shape and black in color. Haribhanga is highly fleshy, fiberless, and typically weighs 200 to 400 grams.
Hatcher		United States	
Heidi		South Africa	
Himayat / Imam Pasand		India	
Himsagar		India (West Bengal), Bangladesh (Rajshahi)	The Himsagar mango is a popular mango cultivar, originating in the modern-day Rajshahi in Bangladesh and state of West Bengal in India. Widely considered as the Champagne of mangoes, the inside of Himsagar is yellow to orange in colour and does not have any fibre. The fruit is medium-sized and weighs between 250 and 350 grams, out of which the pulp content is around 77%. It has a good keeping quality. It is also known as Khirsapati.
Ice Cream		United States	
Irwin		Japan, United States, Australia, Taiwan	Red colored fruit with a soft texture, low fibre, aromatic smell and juicy pulp; purported to be the most expensive mango.
Ivory		Thailand	Also known as the Jingu Ivory mango, or Ivory mango, this long, thin mango is named for its resemblance to a young elephant's tusk. It has thin, smooth skin. The flesh contains very little fibre, and constitutes approximately 82 percent of the fruit. It was first introduced into Yunnan, China, from Thailand in 1914. The actual tree that was the first to be imported still grows, and during one year produced almost 500 kg of fruit.
Jacquelin		United States	
Jakarta		United States	
Jean Ellen		United States	
Julie		Caribbean	A colourful, oval shaped mango with almost flat sides. Has a sweet-tart flavour and a dwarf growth habit. Originated in the Caribbean and is still very popular throughout the region. Julie is a high fibre mango.
Kalepad		India (Andhra Pradesh)	
Kari Ishad		India (Karnataka)	The mango is well known for its luscious taste, unique aroma, generous amount of pulp, shape, and size. Kari Ishad mangoes are characterized by their impressive size and shape typically growing large and assuming an oblique-oval shape. A mature tree can yield up to 2000 fruits in a single season. The mango is harvested from mid-May with a short shelf life of about five days.
Gir Kesar		India (Kachchh)	
Katchamitha		India, Philippines	Katchamitha originated from India, but has become one of the most common cultivars in the Philippines where it is commonly called the "Indian mango". It is commonly eaten while still green and crispy and has a mildly sweet taste. The flesh is fibrous when ripe compared to the native carabao mango.
Keitt		Australia, Brazil, Costa Rica, Ecuador, Italy, South Africa, United States	Keitt (pronounced "kit") is one of the latest season mangoes in South Florida (United States), with fruit into October. Backyard Keitts in South Florida regularly get to 2 pounds, and occasionally as large as 5 pounds.
Kensington Pride		Australia, Italy, United States	
Kent		Australia, Brazil, Ecuador, Guatemala, Honduras, Israel, Italy, Mexico, South Africa, United States	The Kent has a smooth fibreless pulp of orange hue, and rich complex flavour. It appears occasionally in wide distribution in North American supermarkets alongside the far more common Hadens. The original Kent tree still stands in Coral Gables, Florida (United States).
Kohu Amba		Sri Lanka	
Kopyor/pari		Indonesia	
Kothapalli Kobbari		India (Pithapuram, Andhra Pradesh)	Also known as Kobbari Mamidi.
Kuttiattoor Mango		India (Kuttiattoor, Kerala)	Its striking orange-yellow color and superior taste, makes the Kuttiattoor mango a favorite. Its ripened skin remains remarkably speckle-free, enhancing its visual appeal. The mango variety is fleshy & juicy with high fiber content.
Lakshmanbhog		India	
Lancetilla		Honduras, United States	Lancetilla can bear 5-pound fruit, but the eating quality is considered subpar among mango connoisseurs. The fruit is prone to splitting on the tree.
Langra		India	
Lemon Meringue		Myanmar	
Lippens		United States	
Madame Francis		Haiti	Large kidney shaped mango that ripens to a golden yellow colour with piquant flesh Commonly exported to the United States in spring; often a feature of NYC fruit stands. Madame Francis is a high fiber mango.
Mahachanok		Asia, United States	Mahachanok is an oblong commercial mango from Asia, with yellow to orange color exterior when ripe. Described as a fiberless, sweet, and pleasant mango. The leaves of the tree are dark green and slimmer than many other mango trees.
Mallika		India, Nepal, United States	
Malwana (mango)		Sri Lanka	
Manilita		United States	
Manohar		India (Punjab)	Large mango that grows in clusters, a seedling of Chaunsa. Exceptional complex flavor good sweetness. Very vigorous.
Marathwada Kesar		India (Maharashtra)	It is named for its saffron-like color and flavor, has the highest soluble solids content among Indian mango varieties.
Momi K		Hawaii, United States	Teardrop shaped with a narrow point. Ripens to a reddish orange blush. Flesh has a creamy consistency.
Muhammad Wala		Pakistan	
Mulgoba		India, United States	Small mango with a comparatively big seed. Parent of the Haden mango.
Nam Doc Mai		Thailand, United Arab Emirates	Fruit is elongated, with a prominent beak, and is normally yellow with green spots.
Neelam		India, Pakistan	Weighing 9 to 12 oz, with the general shape of a fat cashew nut, Neelam are smooth-skinned and bright yellow upon ripening and have no blush. The flesh is deep yellow to orange, with no fibres and a rich, aromatic flavor that may overpower an unaccustomed palate. They have a late ripening season and can be stored for an extended time. Fruit should be harvested when mature green and ripened at room temperature off the tree.
Osteen		Italy, Spain, United States	
Owais		Egypt	
Paige			
Palmer		Australia, Brazil, United States	
Panakalu		India (Andhra Pradesh)	
Panchadharakalasa		India (Andhra Pradesh)	It is a juicy variety and owes its origin to the East Godavari district of Andhra Pradesh. The name is derived from the Telugu words Panchadara, meaning sugar, and kalasa, meaning a pot.
Paraíso		Mexico	
Parvin		United States	
Payri		India(Maharashtra)	
Piña Colada		United States	Piña Colada is part of the selective breeding program by Zills High Performance. Piña Colada is a small fruit that packs a lot of flavor. The tree is unproductive and susceptible to anthracnose.
Peddarasamu		India (Nuzvid, Andhra Pradesh)	
Philippine			See Carabao (mango).
Pickering			
Pico		Philippines	Along with the Carabao mango, it is one of the most commonly cultivated mango cultivars of the Philippines. Elongated fruits with a prominent beak. Light orange when ripe. Flesh is rich orange to red. Sweet, fairly acidic, with short fibers.
Pim Seng Mun			
Pineapple Pleasure			
Po Pyu Kalay		Myanmar	
Pram Kai Mea			See Brahm Kai Meu.
Raspuri		India (Karnataka)	An extremely popular variety in South India, a fully ripe Raspuri (Rasa in Kannada means Juice) can produce a significant amount of juice per mango.
Rataul		India (Uttar Pradesh)	Named after its birthplace in Rataul, Uttar Pradesh, the Rataul mango was introduced to Pakistan when migrants from India took its seeds and began cultivating it in Multan. Characterized by its greenish-yellow color, this medium-sized mango reveals a luscious orange pulp, with a captivating aroma and offering a very sweet and delicious taste.
Red Willard		Sri Lanka	
Red Willard		Sri Lanka	
Rewa Sunderja Mango		India (Madhya Pradesh)	Sunderja mango is distinctively fibre-free and boasts a unique sugar profile, rendering it an ideal choice for diabetes patients seeking a sweet and healthy treat.
Rosa		Brazil	Rosa ("pink") mango is a variety found more easily in Northeast Region of Brazil, also known as 2Rosa da Bahia2 or "Rosa de Pernambuco". Because it is very sweet but also very fibrous, it is mostly used to prepare juices or desserts in which it will be crushed.
Rosigold		United States	Rosigold is among the earliest season mangoes in South Florida. Rosigold is susceptible to anthracnose.
Ruby		United States	
Ryan			
Saigon		United States	
San Felipe		Cuba	Fruit is large at 20 ounces with a striking oxblood color; the flesh is yellow.
Saharni		Pakistan	
Sammar Bahisht		Pakistan, India	(in Urdu Sammar means fruit and Bahisht means Paradise)
Sensation		South Africa, United States	
Shan-e-Khuda		Pakistan	
Sindhri		Mirpur Khas district, Sindh province of Pakistan	Significantly aromatic and sweet, the flesh of the Sindhri is soft, slick, and orange when fully ripe. Although many enjoy it as is, other consumers find the Sindhri wanting in sourness and may wish to eat it before it is fully ripe.
Sindoori		India	It's red colored spot at the top gives it the name Sindoori mango.
Sophie Fry		United States	
Southern Blush		United States	
Spirit of '76		United States	Spirit of '76 is a seedling in Florida. The mango is fiberless and has a pleasant sweet flavor.
Springfels		United States	One of the older cultivars from Florida, but still good tasting. It is a large mango, but due to its size it has uneven ripening. The uneven ripening is known as "jelly seed", where the flesh around the seed is overripe and soft.
Sunrise			
Sunset		United States	
Swarnarekha		India (Andhra Pradesh)	
Sweet Tart			
Tess Pollok			
Tommy Atkins		Brazil, Costa Rica, Ecuador, Guatemala, Honduras, Israel, Italy, Mexico, South Africa, United Arab Emirates, United States, Venezuela	One of the most commonly sold mangoes in the world. Has extremely long shelf life. Hard and oblong exterior.
Torbert		United States	
Totapuri		India	
Turpentine		United States	Turpentine is a small, high fiber mango that is poly embryonic mango. Turpentine is used as a rootstock in Florida for grafting other mango varieties.
Ugly Betty			
Valencia Pride		South Africa, United States	Large, oblong mango. Sweet, mild flavor, but the fruit is prone to splitting on the tree. The tree is a vigorous grower.
Van Dyke		Italy, United States	
Vellai Kolomban		Sri Lanka	
Young		United States	Young mango was renamed the "Tebow" (after the American football player) for marketing purposes.
Zill		South Africa, United States	Zill is a seedling of Haden planted in 1922 by Carl King of Lake Worth, Florida (US). Vigorous tree, fruit is good eating quality.

== List of cultivars by nation ==
=== Asia ===
- Bangladesh: Amrapali, Haribhanga, Himsagar (also known as Kshirshapat or Khirshapati), BARI-4, Langra, Chokanan, BARI-11, Mahachanok, Gaurmati, BARI-13, Mallika, Sindoori, Gopalbhog, Gobindobhog, Brindabani, Gulabkhash, Ranipchanda, Lakhkhonbhog (also known as Lakhna or Guti), Fazli, Mohanbhog, Ashwina, BARI-3, BARI-1, BAU-23, BAU-24, BAU-14 (also known as banana mango)
- Cambodia: Cambodiana
- China: Baiyu, Guixiang, Huangpi, Huangyu, Macheco, Sannian, Yuexi
- India: Alphonso, Alampur Baneshan, Amrapali, Badshahpasand, Bangalora, Banganapalle, Black and Rose, Bombay, Bombay Green, Badami, Chausa, Cheruku Rasalu, Chinna rasalu, Chitoor, Chinnarasam, Dasheri, Dudhiya Malda, Ela Manga, Fajri Kalan, Fazli, Fernandian, HusanNara, Gaddamar, Gadam Mary, Gulabkhas, Himayath, Himsagar, Imam Pasand, Imam Hussain, Jehangir, Kalepad, Kishen Bhog, Komanga, Kothapalli Kobbari, Kuttiatoor, Kalami, Gir Kesar, Lalbaug, Langra, Maharaja Pasand, Maldah, Malgis, Malgoa, Mallika, Mankurad, Mercury, Moovandan, Nagulapalli Rasalu, Nasik Pasand, Nattuma, Nannari, Neelum, Neeleshan, Nuzividu Rasalu, Njettukuzhiyan, Ottu Mangai, Panchadara Kalasa, Panduri Mamidi, Payri, Pedda Rasalu, Priyoor, Puliyan, Rani, Rajapuri, Raspuri, Ratna, Rayal Special, Rumani, Safeda, Sammar Bahisht, Sundari, Surkha, Suvarnarekha, Thalimango, Totapuri, Vanraj, Yahya Mariam Mango, Zardalu
- Indonesia: Casturi/Kasturi, Gadung, Gedong Gincu, Manalagi, Mangga Madu, Mangga Alpukat, Mangga Apel, Budiraja, Garifta, Mangga Pisang, Cengkir/Indramayu, Gajah, Bapang, Lalijiwo, Kueni, Golek, Kemiri, Boled, Bengkulu, Situbondo, Kelapa, Alor, Selaputih, Kedundang, Kopyor/Pari, Podang
- Republic of Korea: Apple mango, Irwin, Zillate
- Japan: Miyazaki, Irwin
- Malaysia: Harumanis, Apple Mango, Apple Rumani, Golek, Kuala Selangor, Malgoa, Maha-65, Tok Boon
- Myanmar: Aung Din, Ma Chit Su, Po Pyu Kalay, Sein Ta Lone, Shwe Hin Tha
- Nepal: Alphonso, Malda, Amrapali, Dusehri, Mallika, Bombay, Mallika, Pharsi aamp, Supadi aamp, Sindure aamp, Lohore aamp and other local cultivars.
- Pakistan: Almaas, Alphonso, Anmol, Anwar Rataul, BaganPali, Chaunsa, Chok Anan, Collector, Dusehri, Desi Ada Pamato, Desi Badam, Desi Gola, Desi Badshah, Dilkash, Fajri, Gulab Janhu, Gulab Khas, Lahoti, Lal Badshah, Langra, Malda, Muhammad Wole, Nawab Puri, Neelum, Rani Phool, Sindhri, Saroli, Sawarnarika, Saleh Bhai, Saib, Shan-e-Khuda, Taimuria, Toofan, Wanghi, Zafran
- Philippines: Apple mango, Carabao (Kinalabaw), Kabayo (Cabayo), Katchamitha ("Indian"), Pico (Padero), Paho, Pahohutan
- Singapore: Apple Mango, Arumanis, Golek, Kaem Yao, Mangga Dadol
- Sri Lanka: Dampara, Hingurakgoda, Karutha Kolomban, Malwana (underground) amba, Parrot Mango and Peterpasand, Petti amba, Rata amba, Vellai Kolomban, Wild Mango, Willard, Mee Amba, Kohu Amba, Pol Amba, Giraa amba, Red Willard, Green Willard, Mallika, TJC Mango.
- Taiwan: JinHwang, Red JinHwang, TaiNong No. 1, Irwin
- Thailand: Selected Mango varieties in Thai alphabet order:
  - ก: แก้ว 007 Kaeo 007, กระแตลืมรัง Kratae Luemrang, กระสวย Krasuay, กล้วย Kluay, กะล่อนทอง Kalonthong, การะเกด Karaket, กาละแม Kalamae, กำปั่น Kampan, แก้มแดง Kaemdaeng, แก้วขาว Kaeo Khao, แก้วเขียว Kaeo Khieo, แก้วทวาย Kaeo Tawai, แก้วลืมคอน Kaeo Luemkon, แก้วลืมรัง Kaeo Luemrang, แก้วสามปี Kaeo Sampi, แก้วหอม Kaeo Hom.
  - ข: ขอช้าง Khochang, ขายตึก Khaituek, ขี้ใต้ Khitai, ขี้ทุบ Khithup, ขุนทิพย์ Khunthip, เขียวไข่กา Khiaokhaika, เขียวภูเก็ต Khiaopuket, เขียวเสวย Khiaosawoey, เขียวเสวยรจนา Khiaosawoey Rotchana (objectively rated as the tastiest mango), ไขตึก Khaituek.
  - ค: คล้ายเขียวเสวย Khlay Khiaosawoey, คอนกแก้ว Khonokkaeo, ค้างคาวลืมรัง Khangkao Luemrang, คำ Kham, คุ Ku.
  - ง: งาขาวหรืองาหม่นยาว Nga Khaomonyao, งาเขียว Nga Khiao, งาช้าง Nga Chang, งาดาบ Nga Dap, งาแดง Nga Daeng, งาท้องเรือ Nga Thongruae, งาหม่น Nga Mon, เงาะ Ngo.
  - จ: จันทร์เจ้าขา Chanchaokha, จำปา Champa, เจ้าคุณทิพย์ Chaokhunthip, เจ้าพระยา Chaopraya, เจ้าเสวย Chaosawoey.
  - ช: ช้างตกตึก Changtoktuek, โชคโสภณ Chok Sopon, โชคอนันต์ Chok Anan, โชคอนันต์ก้านชมพู Chok Anankanchompu.
  - ต: ตลับนาค Talapnak, ตะเพียนทอง Tapianthong, ตับเป็ด Tuppet, ตาเตะหลาน Ta Te-Lan, แตงกวา Thaeng Kwao.
  - ท: ทวายเดือนเก้า Thawai Dueankao, ทองขาว Thongkhao, ทองขาวกลม Thongkhaoklom, ทองขาวยาว Thongkhaoyao, ทองเจ้าพัฒน์ Thongchaopat, ทองดำ Thongdam, ทองดำกลายพันธุ์ Thongdam Klaipan, ทองดำมีร่อง Thongdam Mirong, ทองแดง Thongdaeng, ทองทวาย Thongthawai, ทองประกายแสด Thongprakaisat, ทองปลายแขน Thongplaikhean, ทองไม่รู้วาย Thongmairuwai, ทุเรียน Thurian, ทูลถวาย Thunthawai, เทพนิมิตร Thepnimit, เทพรส Thepparot.
  - น: นวลจันทร์ Nuanchan, นวลแตง Nuanthaeng, นาทับ Nathap, น้ำดอกไม้ Nam Doc Mai, น้ำดอกไม้ทวาย Namdokmai Thawai, น้ำดอกไม้เบอร์ 4 Namdokmai No.4, น้ำดอกไม้เบอร์ 5 Namdokmai No.5, น้ำดอกไม้พระประแดง Namdokmai Phrapradaeng, น้ำดอกไม้สีทอง Namdokmai Sithong, น้ำดอกไม้สุพรรณ Namdokmai Suphan, น้ำตาลจีน Namtan Chin, น้ำตาลเตา Namtan Tao, น้ำตาลปากกระบอก Namtan Pakkrabok, น้ำตาลทรายหนัก Namtansainak, น้ำผึ้ง Nampueng.
  - บ: บานเย็น Banyen, บุญบันดาล Bunbandan, เบา Bao.
  - ผ: ผ้าขี้ริ้วห่อทอง Pakhirio Hothong.
  - พ: พญาลืมเฝ้า Payaluemfao, พญาเสวย Payasawoey, พรวนขอ Phruankho, พราหมณ์ก้นขอ Phram Konkho, พราหมณ์เนื้อแดง Phram Nueadaeng, พราหมณ์เนื้อเหลือง Phram Nuealueang, พัดน้ำผึ้ง Phatnampueng, พิมเสนกลายพันธุ์ Phimsen Klaipan, พิมเสนแดง Phimsen Daeng, พิมเสนเปรี้ยว Phimsen Preow, พิมเสนมัน Phimsen Man, เพชรบ้านลาด Phetbanlat.
  - ฟ: ฟ้าลั่น Falan, ฟ้าแอปเปิล Fa-apple, แฟบ Faep.
  - ม: มนโฑ Monto, มะปราง Maprang, มะลิลา Malila, มันบางขุนศรี Manbangkhunsi, มันค่อม Mankom, มันทวาย Manthawai, มันทวายนักรบ Manthawai Nakrop, มันทองเอก Manthong Aek, มันทะลุฟ้า Manthalufa, มันบ้านลาด Manbanlat, มหาชนก Mahachanok, มันพิเศษ Manpiset, มันสะเด็ด Mansadet, มันสายฟ้า Mansaifa, มันหมู Manmu, มันหยด Manyot, มันหวาน Manwan, มันแห้ว Manhaeo, มันอยุธยา Man Ayuthaya, เมล็ดนิ่ม Maletnim, แม่ลูกดก Maelukdok, แมวเซา Maeosao.
  - ย: ยายกล่ำ Yaiglam.
  - ร: รจนา Rotchana, ระเด่นขาว Radenkhao, ระเด่นเขียว Radenkhiao, แรด Raet.
  - ล: ล่า La, ลิ้นงูเห่า Lin Nguhao, ลูกกลม Lukklom, ลูกแดง Lukdaeng, ลูกโยนพระอินทร์ Lukyon Phra-in, เล็บมือนาง Lepmuenang.
  - ศ: ศาลายา Salaya.
  - ส: สังขยา Sangkhaya, สามปี Sampi, สามฤดู Samruedu, สายทิพย์ Saithip, สายน้ำค้าง Sainamkang, สายฝน Saifon, สาวน้อยกระทืบหอ Saonoi Kratuepho, สำปั่น Sampan, สีส้ม Sisom, แสงทอง Saengthong.
  - ห: หงษ์ทอง Hongthong, หงษ์สา Hongsa, หงสาวดี Hongsawadi, หนองแซง Nongsaeng, หนังกลางวัน Nangklangwan, หมอนทอง Monthong, หวานน้ำผึ้ง Wannampueng, หอยแครง Hoikrang, หอระฆัง Horakang, หินทอง Hinthong, แห้ว Haeo, แห้วหลวงอิงค์ Haeo Luanging.
  - อ: อกร่อง Okrong, อกร่องกะทิ Okrong Kati, อกร่องขาว Okrong Khao, อกร่องเขียว Okrong Khiao, อกร่องทอง Okrong Thong, อกร่องทองดำกลายพันธุ์ Okrong Thongdamklaiphan, อกร่องไทรโยก Okrong Saiyok, อกร่องพิกุลทอง Okrong Phikunthong, อกร่องภรณ์ทิพย์ Okrong Phonthip, อกร่องมัน Okrong Man, อกร่องหอมทอง Okrong Homthong, อ่อนมัน Onman, อินทรชิต Inthorachit, ไอ้ฮวบ Ai-Huap.
- Vietnam: Cao Lãnh Cát Chu mango, Bình Định Elephant mango, Hoà Lộc Sand mango.

=== Oceania ===
- Australia: B74 (known by the brand name Calypso), Brooks, Haden, Honey Gold, Hula, Irwin, Keitt, Kensington Pride, Kent, Keow Savoy (Green eating), Lady Grace, Lady Jane, Mahachanok, Nam Doc Mai, Palmer, R2E2, Scarlet Delight.
- Hawaii: Hawaiian Common, Gouveia, Hawaiian Dwarf, Kurahige, Mapulehu, Momi K, Pope, Rapoza, Sugai, Turpentine.

=== Africa ===
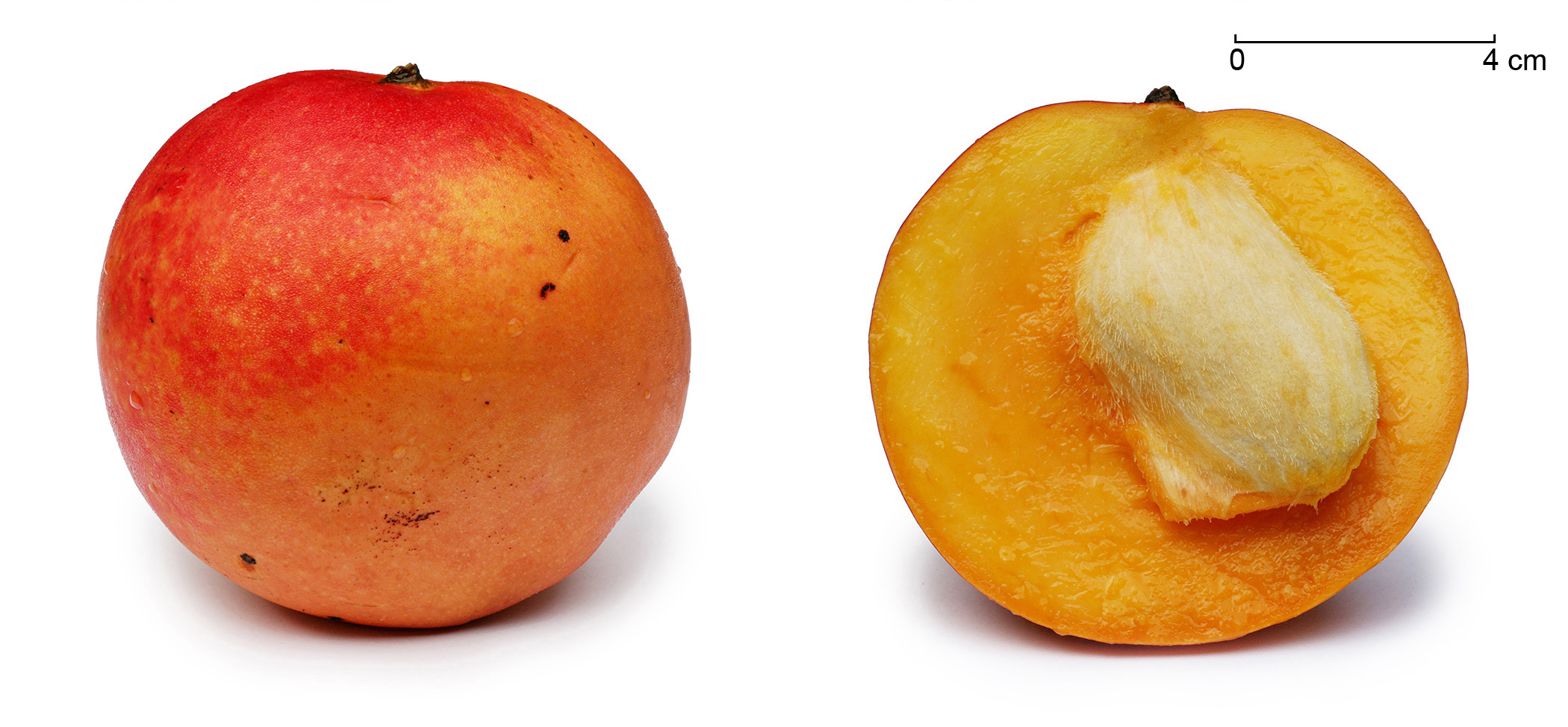
Apple mango

- Cameroun: Améliorée du Cameroun.
- Egypt: Alphonso, Hindi, Hindi Besennara, Beid El Agl, Oweisi, Fuss Oweis, Taymoor, Zebdiah, Mesk, Kit, Kent, Naomi, R2, Alb el tor, Haidy, Sedika, Khad el gamil, Farasha, Baldi.
- Kenya: Apple Mango, Batwi, Boubo, Ngowe.
- Mali: Amelie, Kent.
- Sénégal: Keitt, Kent, Boulkodiekhal, Diegbougatt, Sewe, Greffal, Sierra Leone, Papaye, Pêche, Diourou.
- Réunion island: Carotte, José, Lucie, Auguste.
- South Africa: Fascell, Haden, Keitt, Kent, Sensation, Tommy Atkins, Zill, Peach(sa), Saber, Piva, Nele petite.
- Sudan: Alphonso,Baladiya,Sunnariya, Samakiya.
- Tanzania: Boribo Muyini, Dodo, Mawazo, Sindano.
- Zambia: Heidi, Kent, Sensation, Tommy.

=== Americas ===
- Brasil: Coquinho, Haden, Espada, Espada de Ouro, Keitt, Kent, Rosa, Palmer, Tommy Atkins
- Costa Rica: Haden, Irwin, Keitt, Mora, Tommy Atkins.
- Cuba: San Felipe, Prieto, Toledo.
- Ecuador: Ambassador, Alphonso, Ataulfo, Criollos, Haden, Julie, Keitt, Kent, Reina, Tommy Atkins.
- Guatemala: Haden, Kent, Tommy Atkins.
- Haiti: Francisque (Madame Francis), Trop douce (twòdous), Yil, Petit bec (tibèk), Musca, Labiche, Baptiste, Rosalie, Poirier, Corne, Madame Blanc.
- Honduras: Haden, Kent, Lancetilla, Tommy Atkins
- Mexico: Ataulfo, Haden, Irwin, Kent, Manila, Palmer, Sensation, Tommy Atkins, Van Dyke, Petakon, Oro, Criollo, Niño, Miyako.
- Peru: Criollos, Haden, Keitt, Kent, Tommy Atkins.
- Suriname: Rood borsje, Tetéé.
- United States (California): Keitt, Haden, Timotayo, Manila.
- United States (Florida): Alampur Baneshan, Alice, Alphonso, Anderson, Angie, Bailey's Marvel, Bennet Alphonso, Beverly, Bombay, Brahm Kai Meu, Brooks, Carabao, Carrie, Chok Anan, Cogshall, Cushman, Dot, Duncan, Earlygold, East Indian, Edward, Eldon, Emerald, Fairchild, Fascell, Florigon, Ford, Gary, Gaylour, Glenn, Gold Nugget, Golden Lippens, Graham, Haden, Hatcher, Ice Cream, Irwin, Ivory, Jakarta, Jean Ellen, Julie, Keitt, Kensington Pride, Kent, Lancetilla, Langra Benarsi, Lippens, Mallika, Manilita, Mendoza, Mulgoba, Nam Doc Mai, Nam Tam Teen, Neelum, Nu Wun Chan, Okrung, Osteen, Palmer, Parvin, Pascual, Philippine, Pickering, Po Pyu Kalay, Rosigold, Ruby, Rutledge, Saigon, Sensation, Sophie Fry, Southern Blush, Spirit of '76, Springfels, Sunset, Suwon Tip, Tebow, Toledo, Tom Dang, Tommy Atkins, Torbert, Turpentine, Valencia Pride, Van Dyke, Zill.
- Venezuela: Haden, Keitt, Kent, Tommy Atkins.
- West Indies: Amélie, Black (blackie), Bombay, Dou-douce, East Indian, Graham, Haden, Julie (St. Julian), Long, Madame Francis, Rose, Spice-Box, Starch.

=== Europe ===
- Malta: Keitt, Maya, Kensington Pride, Glenn, Irwin
- Italy: Kensington Pride, Glenn, Tommy Atkins, Keitt, Maya, Van Dyke, Osteen, Kent

=== Middle East ===
- Egypt: Zebda, Mesk, Awais, Qalb el tor, Mabrouka, Sennara, Taymour.
- Israel: Haden, Omer, Orly, Shelly, Keitt, Kent, Maya, Nimrod, Palmer, Tommy Atkins, BD-4-98, Zrifin, Palmer, Naomi, King David.
- Yemen: Taimoor, Abu Sanarah, Hafoos, Al Fawnas, Al Bameli, Al Burkani, Sudanese, Abu Samakah.

== See also ==
- International Code of Nomenclature for Cultivated Plants
