= Gold Nugget =

Edible fruit cultivar

Mangifera 'Gold Nugget'
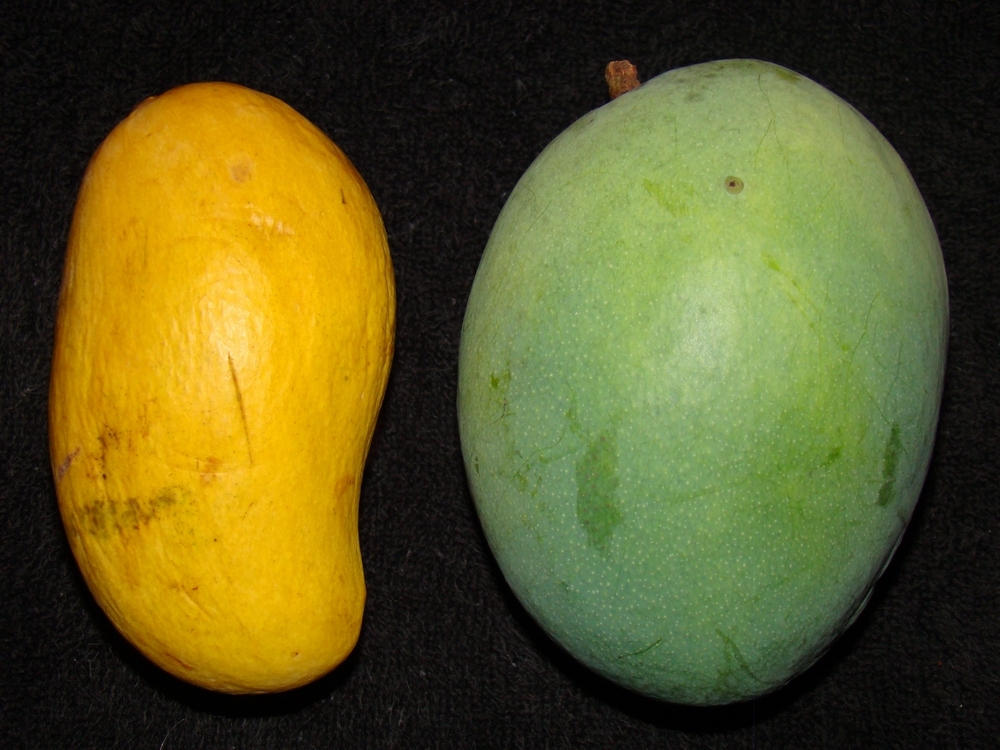
- Comparison of Ataulfo (left) and Gold Nugget (right)
- Genus: Mangifera
- Species: Mangifera indica
- Hybrid parentage: 'Kent' × unknown
- Cultivar: 'Gold Nugget'
- Origin: Florida, US

The 'Gold Nugget' mango (or Golden Nugget) is a named mango cultivar that originated in south Florida.

== History ==
The original tree was grown by Edward F. Mitchell of Miami, Florida. Saigon was thought to possibly be one of the parents of Gold Nugget, but a 2005 pedigree analysis indicated that Gold Nugget was likely an offspring of the Kent mango. Mitchell patented the Gold Nugget in February 1990, which was plant patent number 77158.

The fruit was recognized for its flavor and heavy production characteristics. Gold Nugget is now grown on a small, limited commercial scale in Florida, and is sold as a home dooryard tree by nurseries in the state.

Gold Nugget trees are planted in the collections of the USDA's germplasm repository in Miami and the Miami-Dade Fruit and Spice Park in Homestead, Florida.

== Description ==
The skin of the fruit turns yellow orange at maturity, sometimes with some pink blush. The flesh is yellow and virtually fiberless, with a mild sweet flavor, and contains a monoembryonic seed. It is usually of oval shape and weighs under a pound. Gold Nugget fruit typically matures from late-July to August in Florida.

The tree is a vigorous grower with an open canopy.
