= Alampur Baneshan =

Mango cultivar

Mangifera 'Alampur Baneshan'
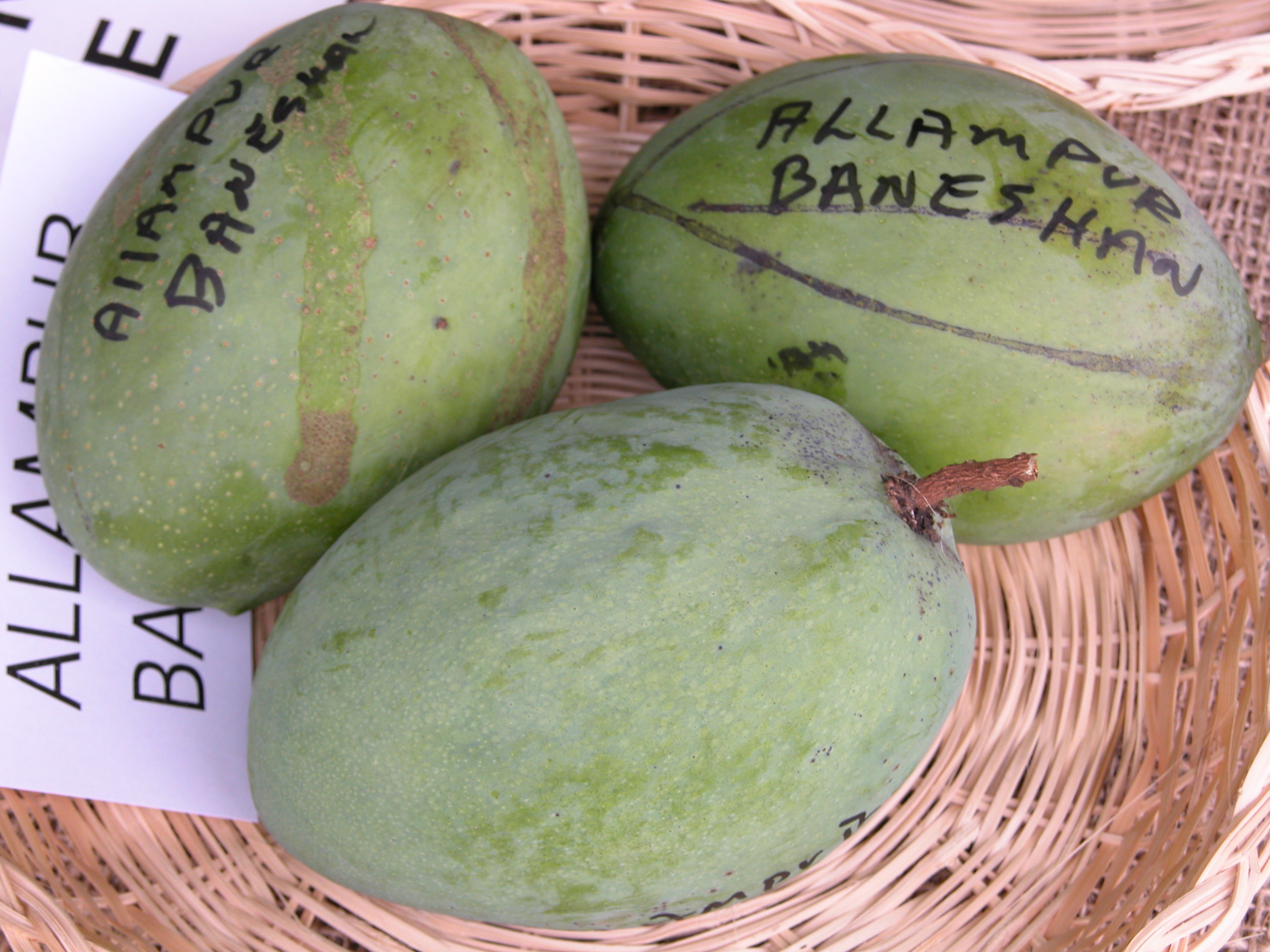
- Unripe Alampur Beneshan mangoes
- Genus: Mangifera
- Species: Mangifera indica
- Cultivar: 'Alampur Baneshan'
- Origin: India

The 'Alampur Baneshan' mango, sometimes spelled Banishan, is a named mango cultivar that originates from India. In Southern India, it is sometimes known as Seeri. It differs from, but is related ancestrally to, the high-volume commercial cultivar Banganapalli. However, this is a much older and prized cultivar.

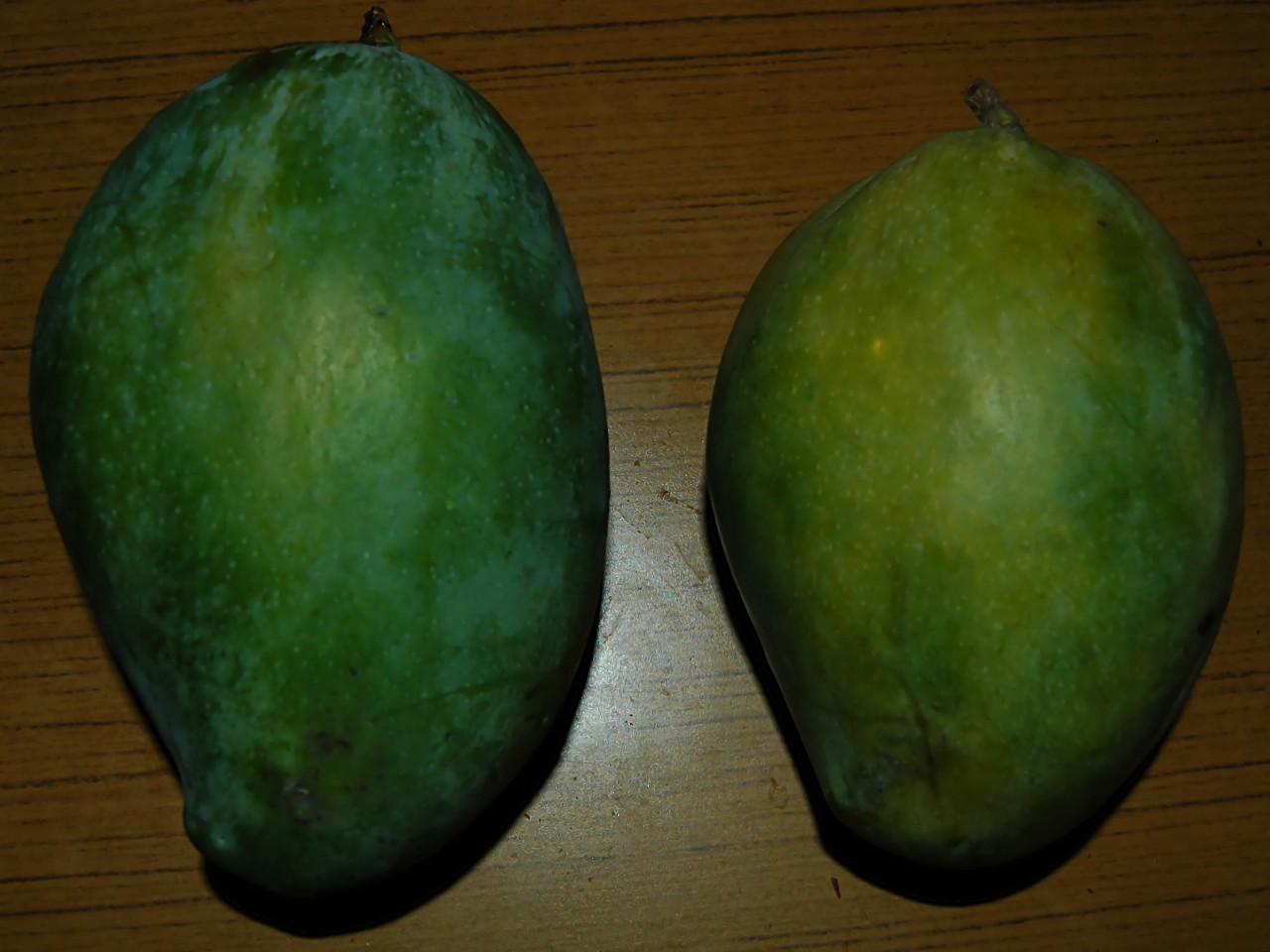
Alampur Beneshan stays green even on ripening - the yellowing one on the right is probably slightly over-ripe. Note the small white pores distributed all over the skin of both mangoes, which is a characteristic of this cultivar.

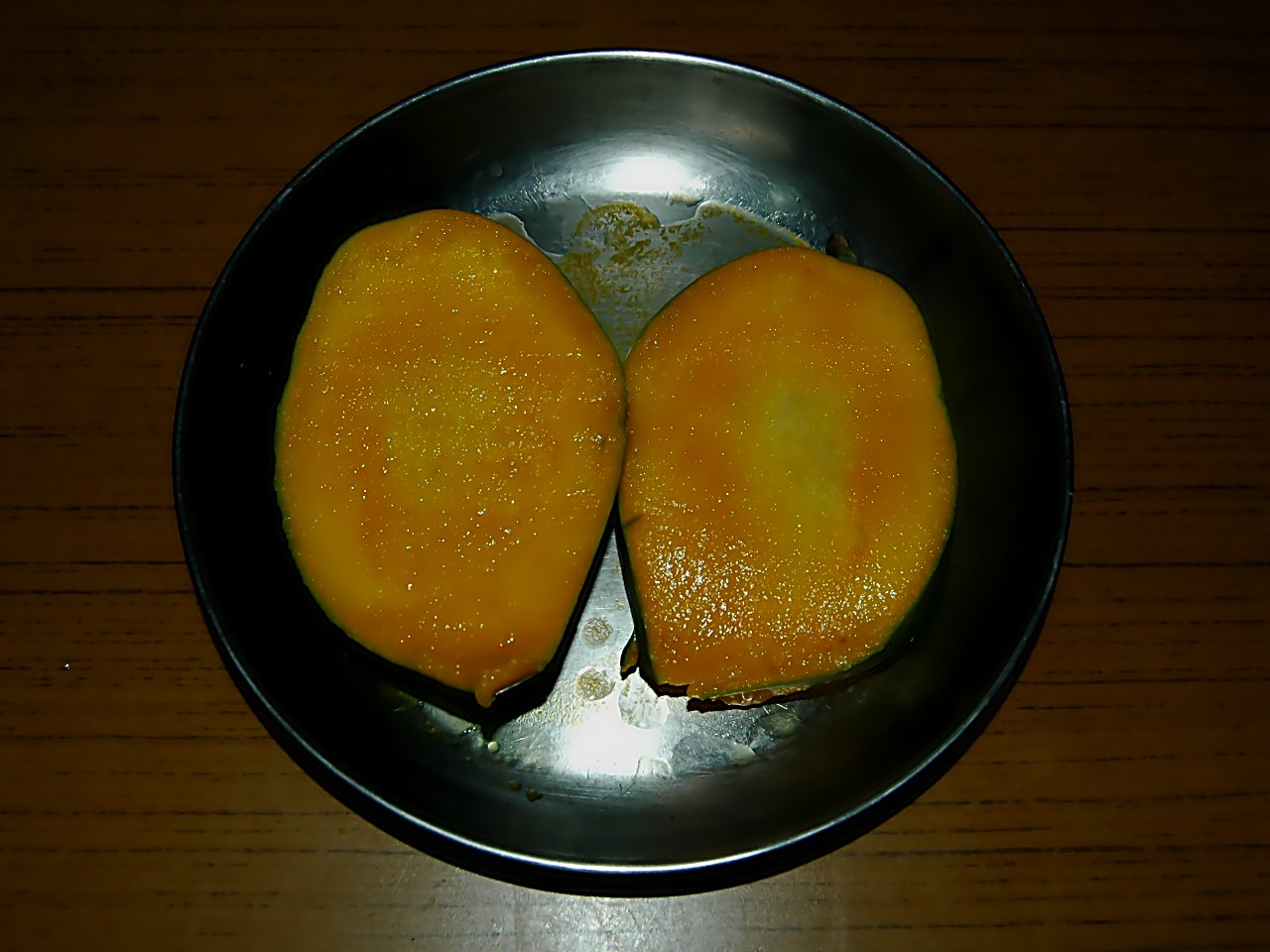
Cut Alampur Beneshan mango. This strain shows a golden-yellow interior, common in the southern Indian strains.

== Description ==
The fruit is medium-sized with thin skin, ranging in color from green to yellow. The flesh of the ripe fruit is fiberless, ranging in color from yellow to golden-yellow to orange-yellow. Many Indian strains stay green even on ripening, though a slight yellowing or blush is often noted near the stalk. The pores in the skin have a distinct whitish coloration. There is a distinct bouquet from the ripe fruit, and the flesh has a deep, slightly tart flavor with slight accents of cinnamon, pepper, jackfruit and other Indian mango cultivars like Alphonso.

== See also ==
- List of mango cultivars
