= Ivory (mango) =

Mango cultivar

Mangifera 'Ivory'
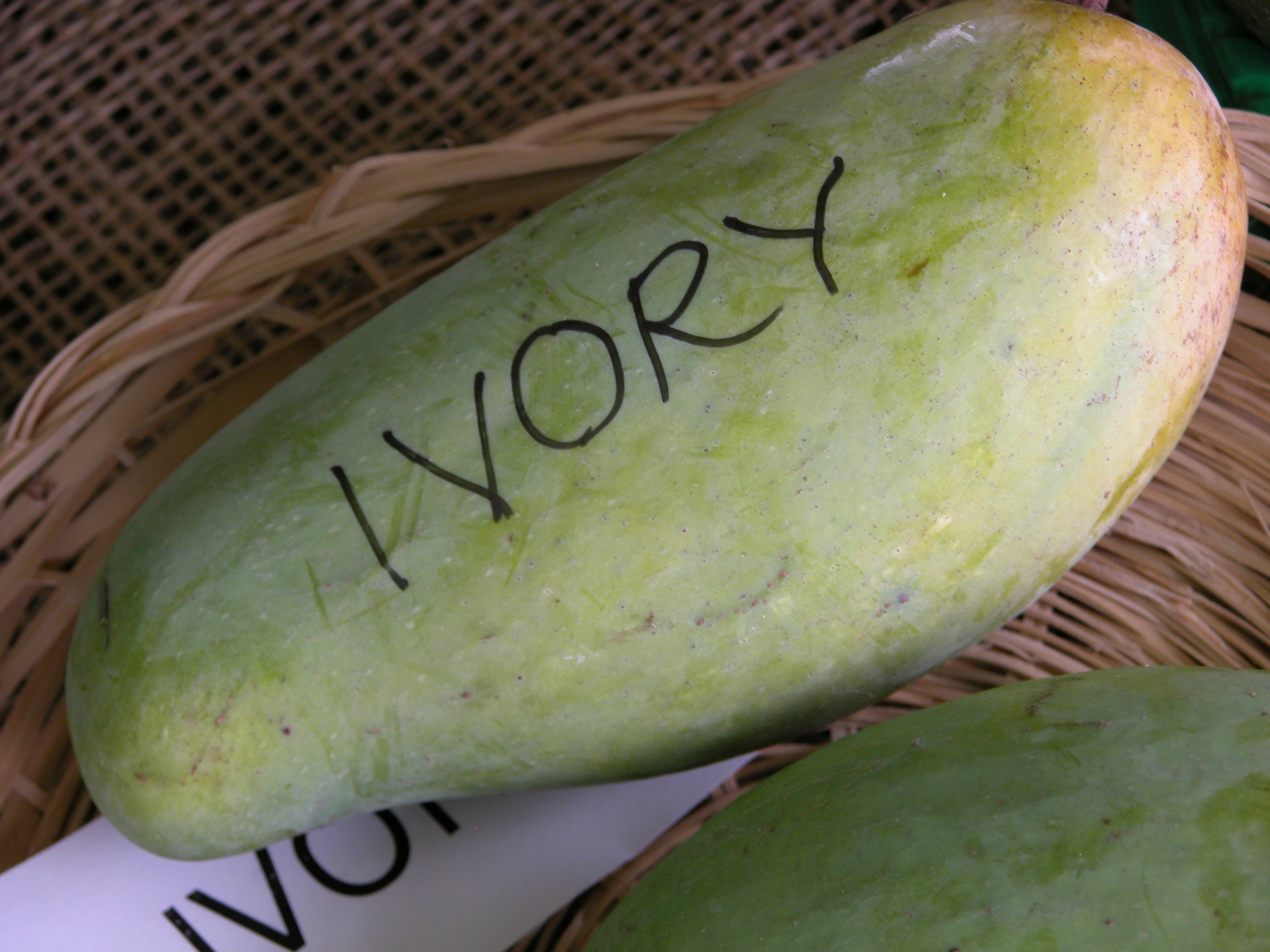
- Genus: Mangifera
- Cultivar: 'Ivory'
- Origin: Thailand

The 'Ivory' mango, also called the jingu ivory, is a mango cultivar from China.

== History ==
Ivory is named for its resemblance to a young elephant's tusk due to its long, thin shape. It was first introduced into Yunnan, China from Thailand in 1914. The actual tree that was the first to be imported still grows, and during one year produced almost 500 kg (1,100 lb) of fruit.

== Description ==
The fruit has thin, smooth skin. The flesh contains very few fibres, and constitutes approximately 82 percent of the fruit.

== See also ==
- List of mango cultivars
