= Ice Cream (mango) =

Edible fruit cultivar

Mangifera 'Ice Cream'
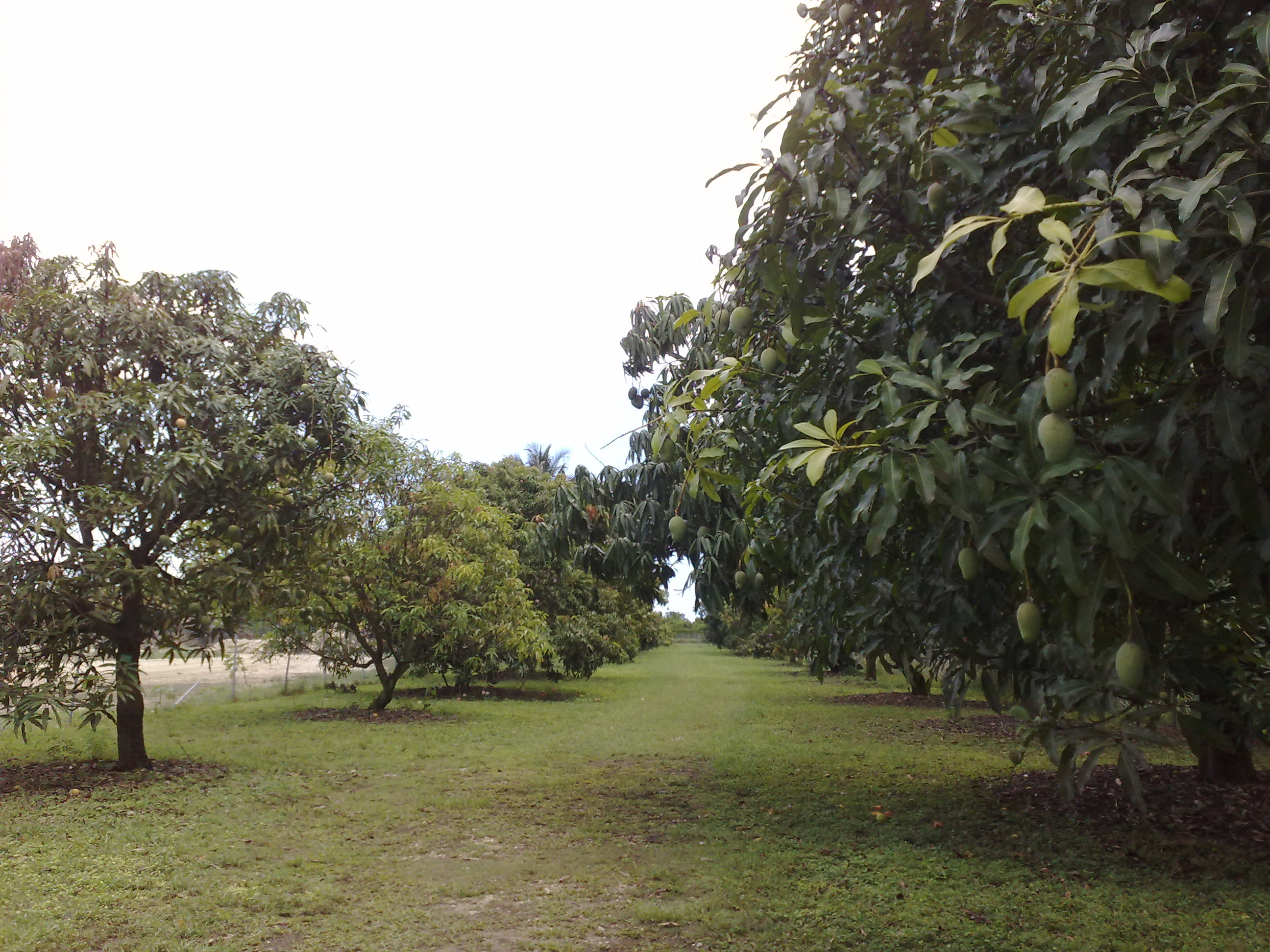
- Fruit & Spice Park mango grove
- Genus: Mangifera
- Species: Mangifera indica
- Cultivar: 'Ice Cream'
- Origin: Trinidad and Tobago

The 'Ice Cream' mango is a semi-dwarf mango cultivar that originated in Trinidad and Tobago and was later introduced to Florida.

== History ==
The Ice Cream cultivar was discovered in Trinidad and Tobago, and was later brought to the United States by Maurice Kong of the Rare Fruit Council International and introduced via Florida. It is of unknown parentage.

It became recognized for its semi-dwarf growth habit; trees can be maintained under 6.5 feet in height, and it has been promoted as a "condo mango" by Dr. Richard Campbell of the Fairchild Tropical Botanic Garden. Because of its dwarf properties, Ice Cream is often grown in a pot. It has become a commonly sold nursery stock tree marketed to home growers in Florida.

Ice Cream trees are now planted at the USDA's tropical fruit germplasm in Miami, Florida, as well as the Miami–Dade Fruit and Spice Park in Homestead, Florida.

== Description ==
Ice Cream fruit are very small in size, averaging only eight ounces (half a pound) at maturity. The fruit tend to be yellow-green, lacking any red blush. Ripe Ice Cream fruit are green. It is a flat oval shape with a bumpy surface. The flesh is fiberless, rich, sweet, and spicy, and contains a monoembryonic seed. The fruit ripens from June to July in Florida. Its spicy sweet taste has been likened to Mango Sorbet. The plant is disease- and pest-tolerant. The plant produces an average yield although trees are not very productive in Florida due to poor fungus resistance. Cross pollination can improve fruit production in Ice Cream.

The trees are of low vigor and can be maintained at heights under 8 feet.
