= Florigon =

Mango cultivar

Mangifera 'Florigon'
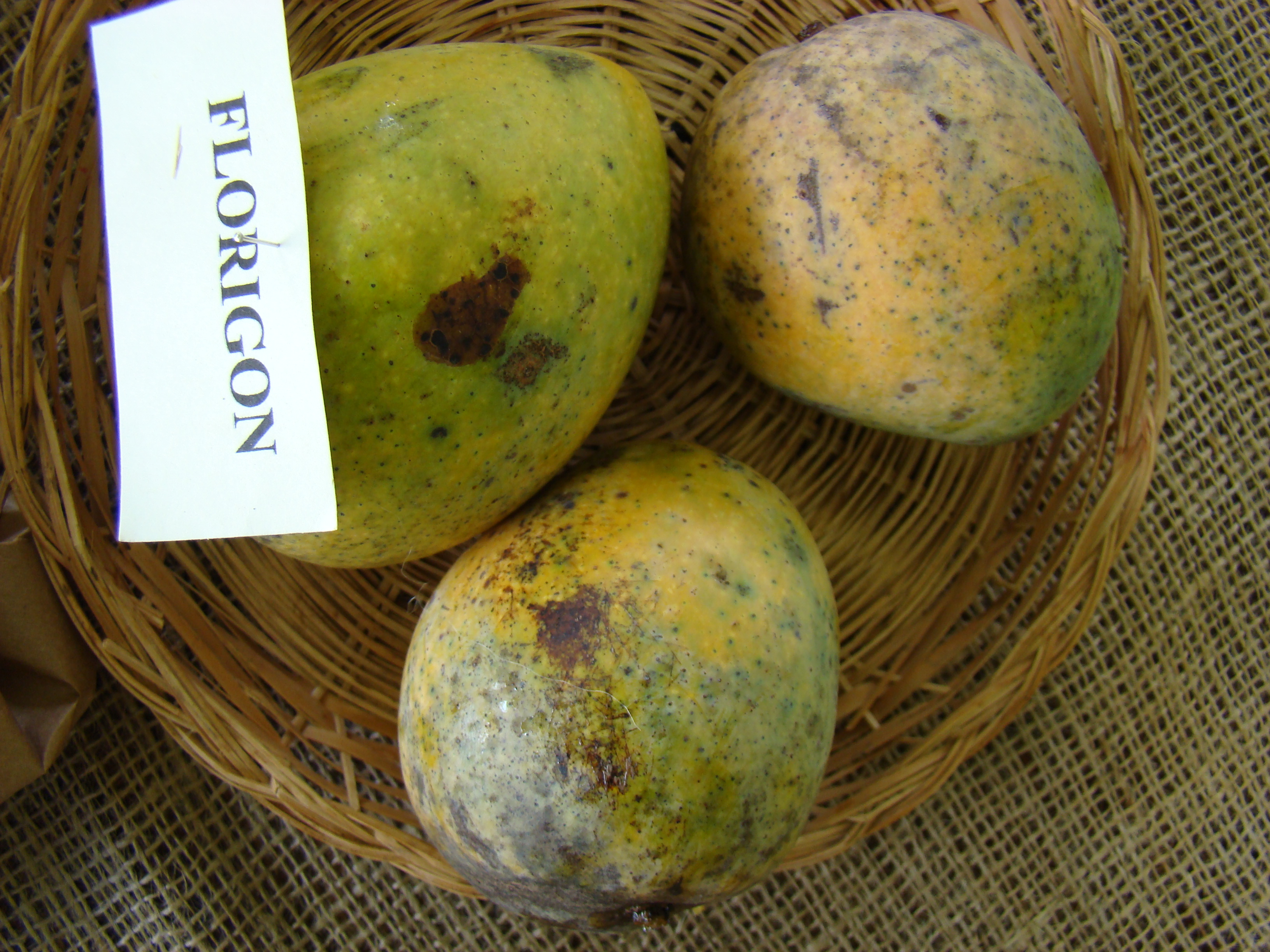
- Display of Florigon mango at the Redland Summer Fruit Festival, Fruit and Spice Park, Homestead, Florida
- Genus: Mangifera
- Species: Mangifera indica
- Cultivar: 'Florigon'
- Origin: Florida, USA

The 'Florigon' mango is a named commercial mango cultivar that originated in south Florida, United States.

== History ==
The original tree grew from a seed planted in 1932 on the property of John G. Kaiser of Fort Lauderdale, Florida. Kaiser was known for growing hybrid mangos, and later became the police chief as well as the clerk of the court for Ft. Lauderdale and later was a member of the executive committee of the Florida Mango Forum. The tree was believed to be a seedling of the Saigon mango, however a 2005 pedigree analysis estimated that Haden was the likely parent, but this is complicated by the fact that Florigon is a polyembryonic mango. The name Florigon was a combination of Florida and Saigon. The tree first fruited in 1936.

Though it was submitted to the variety committee of the Florida Mango Forum, Florigon did not receive widespread attention, nor was it commercially propagated. However, in more recent decades Florigon has become recognized for its excellent flavor, good production characteristics, and disease resistance, and is now sold as nursery stock in Florida as well as grown on a limited commercial scale.

Florigon trees are planted in the collections of the University of Florida's Tropical Research and Education Center in Homestead, Florida, and the Miami-Dade Fruit and Spice Park, also in Homestead. The original Florigon tree is still standing in Ft. Lauderdale.

== Description ==
The fruit is small and ovate in shape, averaging less than a pound in weight. At maturity it is almost entirely yellow, sometimes with some light blush. The yellow flesh is sweet, mild, and non-fibrous, containing a polyembryonic seed. Florigon fruit matures from May to July in Florida.

The trees are moderately vigorous and have upright, open canopies.

== See also ==
- List of mango cultivars
