= Jean Ellen =

Mango cultivar

Mangifera 'Jean Ellen'
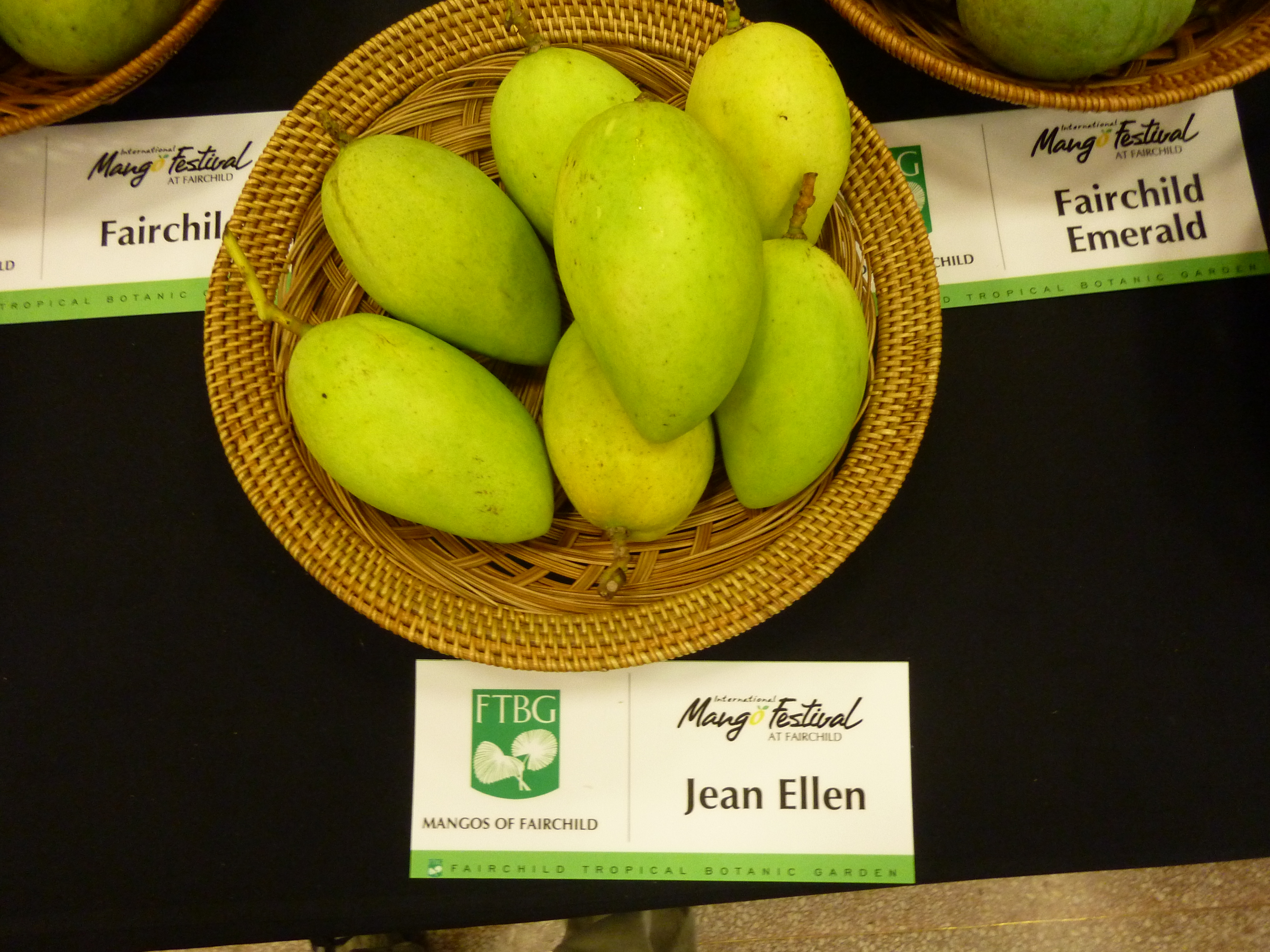
- 'Jean Ellen' mangoes at the 2010 Fairchild Tropical Botanic Garden International Mango Festival in Miami, Florida
- Genus: Mangifera
- Cultivar: 'Jean Ellen'

The 'Jean Ellen' mango is a named mango cultivar that originated in south Florida.

== History ==
Jean Ellen was selected in Florida and promoted as a new dooryard variety by the Fairchild Tropical Botanic Garden due to its relatively small tree size and good production traits. It was selected as a curator's choice mango at Fairchild's 2010 mango festival.

== Description ==
The fruit is of oblong to lanceolate in shape, averaging less than a pound. The skin is yellow at maturity and does not develop any red blush. Flesh yellow, and has minimal fiber. The fruit typically ripens from April to June in Florida.

The trees are considered semi-dwarf.
