= Panchadara Kalasa =

Variety of mango

The Panchadara Kalasa is a variety of mango native to Andhra Pradesh, India, specifically in the East Godavari district. It is also cultivated in other coastal and deccan areas of Andhra Pradesh, and Telangana. The name Panchadara Kalasa translates to "sugar pot" in English, referencing its taste and pot-like shape.

Similar to the Chinna Rasalu variety of mango, the Panchadara Kalasa has a thick skin and sweet, juicy flesh, and is commonly eaten by sucking the juice or squeezing the mango. The fibers of the fruit are short and soft. It is susceptible to powdery mildew and moderately tolerant to grasshoppers.
