= Mallika (mango) =

Hybrid Species of fruit and plant

Mangifera 'Mallika'
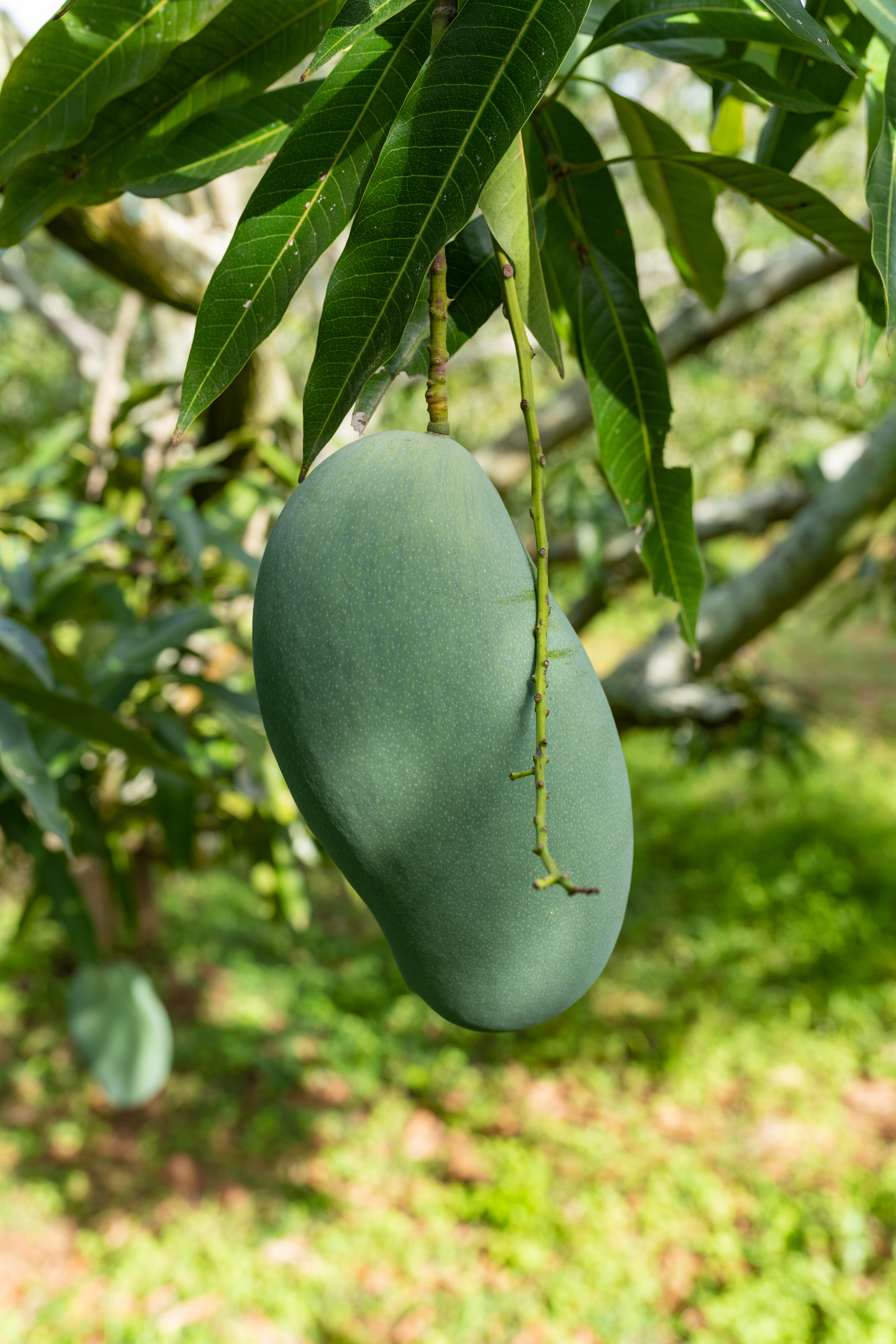
- 'Mallika'
- Genus: Mangifera
- Hybrid parentage: 'Neelum' x 'Dasheri' Mango
- Cultivar: 'Mallika'
- Origin: India

The 'Mallika' mango is the result of the hybridization of the Indian mango varieties Neelum and Dasheri. The variety was developed by Indian Agricultural Research Institute (IARI) in New Delhi and hybridization by Dr. Ramnath Singh. When grafted, the tree will remain a manageable size and is appropriate for dooryard growing. Fruit is normally ready to harvest from June to July.

== Fruit ==
Mallika produces high quality, fiberless Mango fruit. The fruit has prominent citrus, melon and honey notes and is exceptionally sweet. The cultivar met a positive reception at the Fairchild Botanic Gardens International Mango Festival. Mallika are usually grown in tropical to subtropical climates. However, if grown in colder temperatures, the Malika has a higher chance of showing signs of a disease called malformation. Malformation is most prevalent in species of mango that are grown between a range of temperatures of 10-15 degrees Celsius. However, the sign of the disease is not as prevalent in temperatures that are higher than 15 degrees Celsius. The reason for the malformation in the Mallika species is due to the cold temperature causing the mango to produce higher than normal levels of ethylene, which is a chemical produced when the mango exhibits either abiotic or biotic stresses.

After the initial day of harvest, the Mallika changes in physical attributes and chemical structure. Three days after harvesting the Mallika mangos, the color of the skin becomes a reddish yellowish hue. This is due to an increase in the number of carotenoids present within the skin while the chlorophylls start to degrade. The mango is also the most acidic and has the firmest texture on the third day after harvest, but the level of acidity and firmness decreases drastically afterwards. The mango becomes the heaviest on the fifth day after harvest but the size of the mango becomes the smallest by the seventh day after harvest.
