= Shan-e-Khuda =

Mango cultivar

Mangifera 'Shan-e-Khuda'
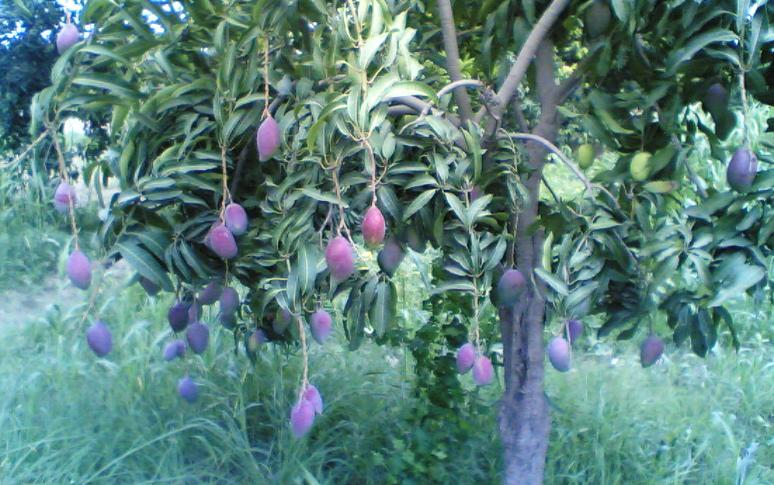
- Shan-e-khuda mango
- Genus: Mangifera
- Species: Mangifera indica
- Cultivar: 'Shan-e-Khuda'
- Origin: Pakistan

The 'Shan-e-Khuda' mango (translated "God's magnificence") is a late-season mango cultivar grown in Pakistan, specifically the Multan and Rahim Yar Khan districts.

== Description ==
The fruit is sweet and ripens in October and November, after most varieties have finished.

The thick skin of Shan-e-Khuda gives it a long shelf life and high export value. It can be found in four colors – red, purple, green, and yellow. It is sometimes called 'Sun Session' because the more sun it receives, the more colors are produced during its ripening season.

The purple variety of 'Shan-e-Khuda' mangoes offers skin benefits by providing a rich source of vitamins and antioxidants. These nutrients contribute to the promotion of healthy and radiant skin, aiding in the reduction of aging signs and the maintenance of skin elasticity.

Consuming Japanese Purple Mangoes may aid in cholesterol management. These mangoes contain dietary fiber and compounds that can help lower cholesterol levels, which is important for heart health.

== See also ==
- List of mango cultivars
