= Brahm Kai Meu =

Mango cultivar

Mangifera 'Brahm Kai Meu'
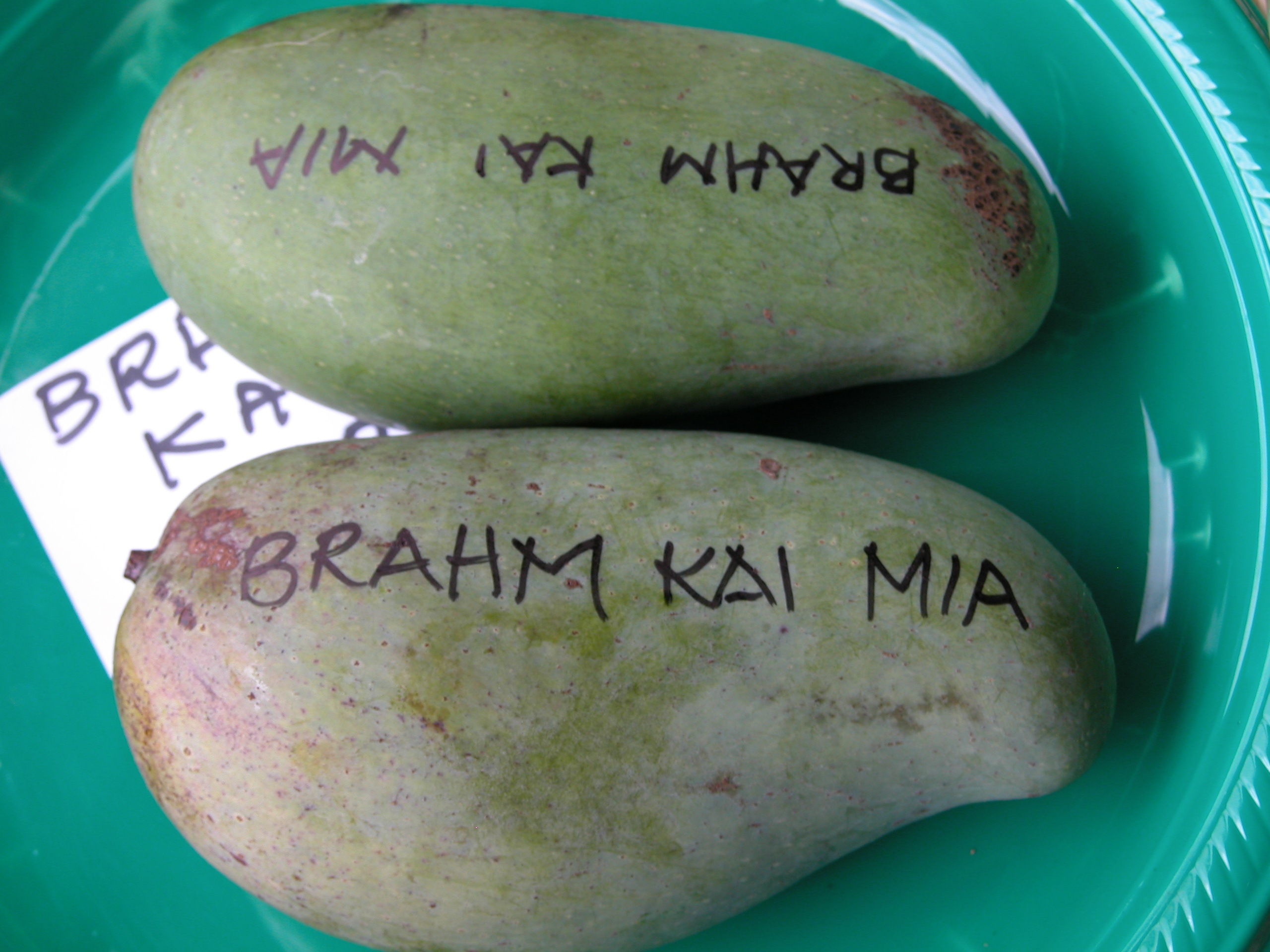
- 'Brahm Kai Meu' mango
- Genus: Mangifera
- Species: Mangifera indica
- Hybrid parentage: Parents unknown
- Cultivar: 'Brahm Kai Meu'
- Origin: Thailand

The 'Brahm Kai Meu' mango (known locally as 'Pram Kai Mea', or 'Phram Khai Mia') is a named mango cultivar of Thai origin. Although it is relatively new in Florida, it appears to be doing very well so far, in terms of growth and yield.

Loosely translated, the name (from Thai: พราหมณ์ขายเมีย, RTGS: Phram Khai Mia) means that this mango is so good that even a Brahmin would trade his own wife for a Brahm Kai Meu mango.

== Description ==
In Thailand, Brahm Kai Meu mango is eaten also in its green state. When ripe, Brahm Kai Meu stays relatively green with hardly any change in color.

This mango is sweet and fibreless.

== See also ==
- List of mango cultivars
