= Imam Pasand =

Edible fruit cultivar

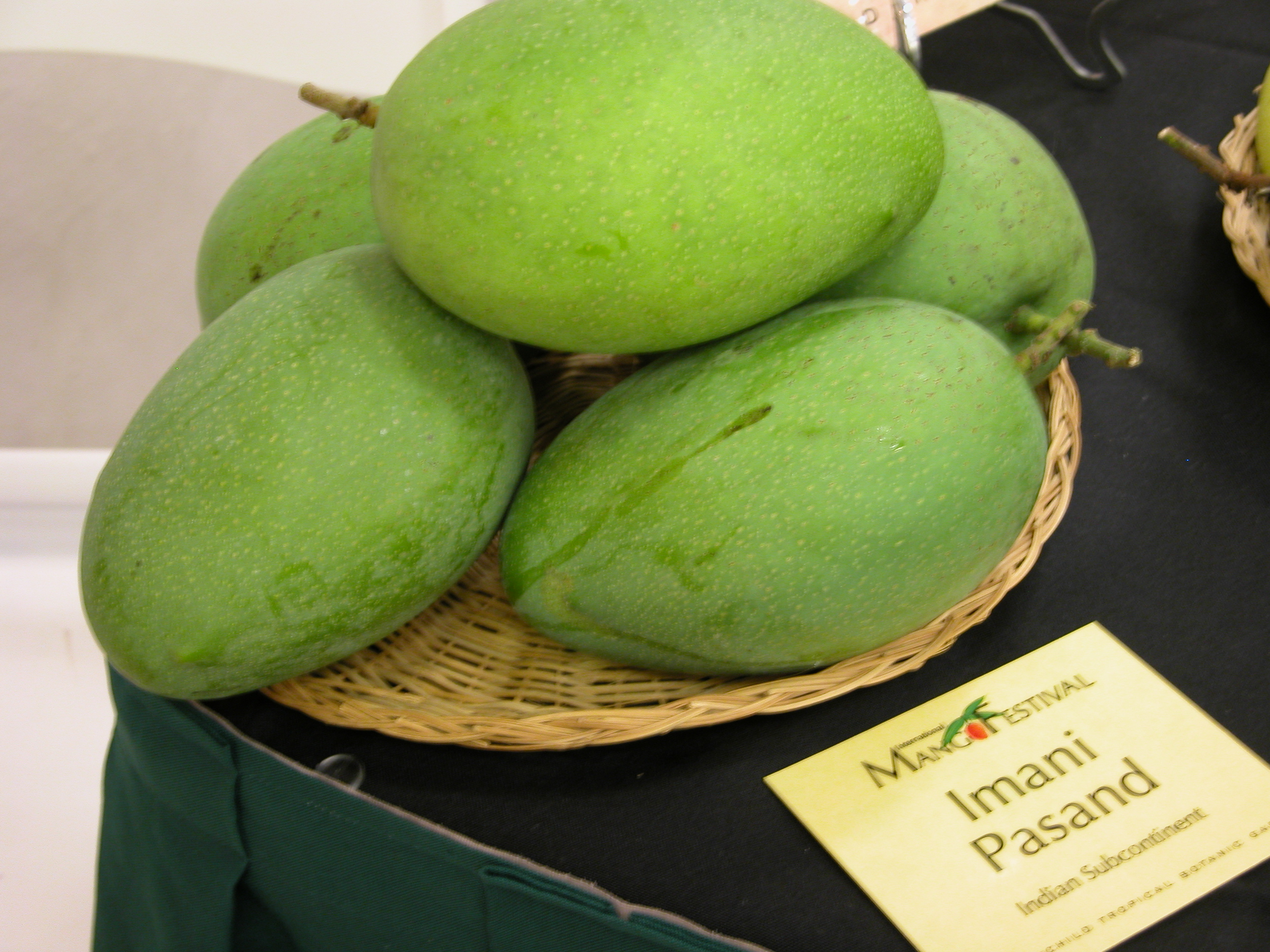
Display of Imam Pasand mango at the 15th Annual International Mango Festival at the Fairchild Tropical Botanic Garden in Coral Gables, Florida.

Hamam (हमाम) Mango, Imam Pasand or Himayat or Himam Pasand is a lesser known and exclusive mango cultivar, grown in Andhra Pradesh, Telangana and Tamil Nadu states in India. The names suggest regal origins and it is said to have been the fruit of choice for India's royalty.

It is available only during the months of May and June and each mango could grow up to 800 grams in weight.

It has been noted as having a “unique taste,” and it has been labeled colloquially as the 'King among Mangoes' by some.

Hamam have a notably soft skin, easy to bite through or even eat, and this also makes it hard to transport. Modern retail systems seem to be cracking how to acquire and distribute them carefully enough and this combined with a wider cultivation area has resulted in increased availability at retail stores

The origin of the prized variety's Hindi name is lost in the mists of time. Some say it was originally grown in Kerala and beloved of Mughal emperor Humayun (and was locally called Humayun Pasand). This fruit known as Himayat in Andhra was supposedly introduced in Tamil Nadu by the family that owns the Thathachariar gardens, a sprawling estate at Srirangam, Tiruchirappalli.
