= Angie (mango) =

Mango cultivar

Mangifera 'Angie'
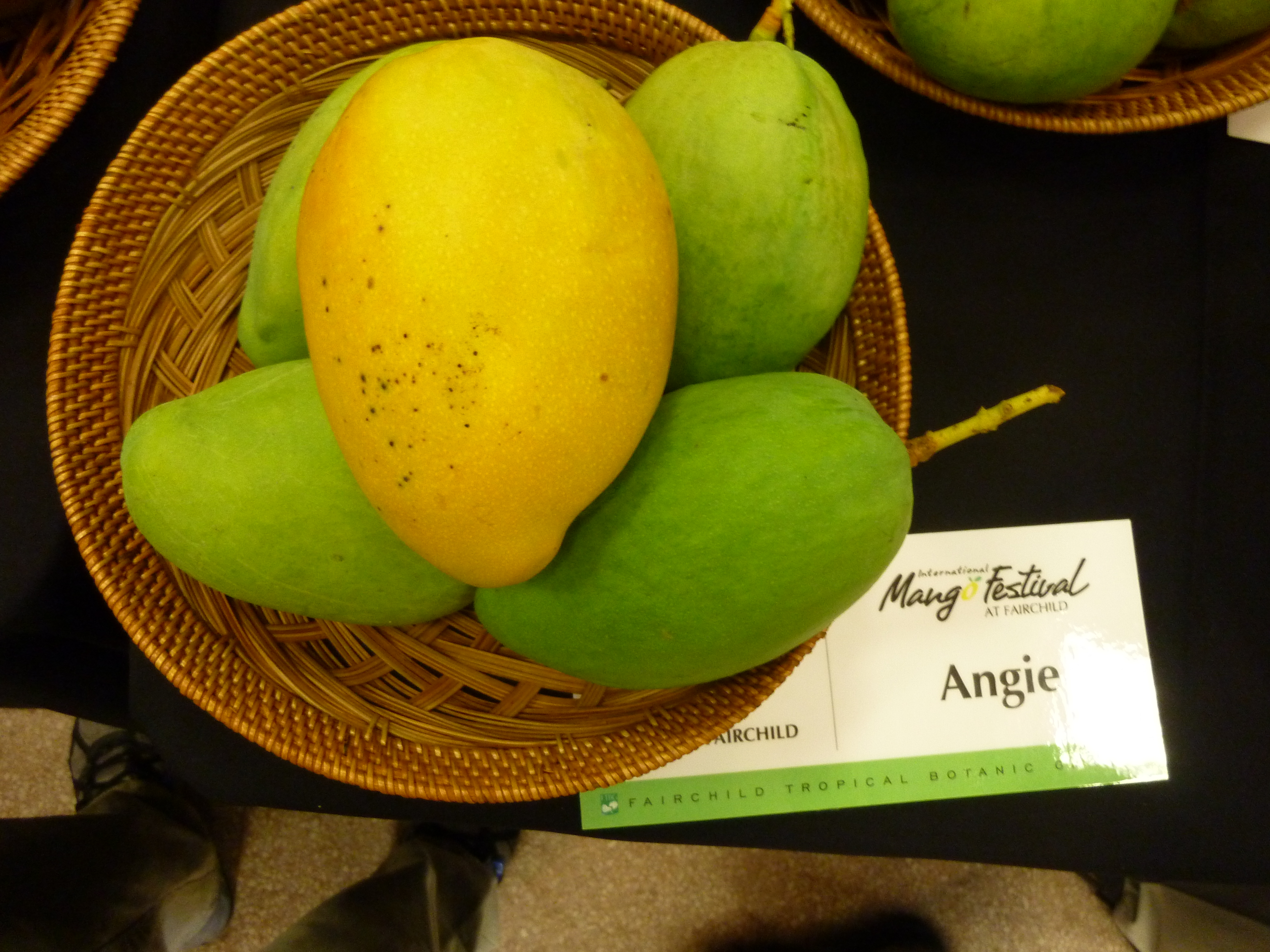
- Photo of Angie mangoes taken at the 2010 International Mango Festival at Fairchild Tropical Botanic Garden, Miami, Florida
- Genus: Mangifera
- Species: Mangifera indica
- Cultivar: 'Angie'
- Origin: Florida, USA

The 'Angie' mango is a named mango cultivar that originated in south Florida.

== History ==
The Angie cultivar was selected for its relatively small growth habit, rich and complex flavor, and good disease resistance. It was named after Angela Whitman, wife of William Francis Whitman Jr., a founder and the first president of The Rare Fruit Council International, Inc. (RFCI) in Miami. Angela is also a trustee of Fairchild Tropical Botanic Garden. 'Angie' was featured as a Curator's Choice mango at the Fairchild Garden's 2010 mango festival. It was one of several mangoes recommended by Fairchild's Curator of Tropical Fruit, Dr. Richard Campbell & Dr. Noris Ledesma, for home growers.

== Description ==
The fruit is yellow to orange in color at maturity, and average weight is about 400 grams (14 oz). The flavor is rich and sweet.

The trees are considered semi-dwarf and easy to manage through pruning.
