= Graham (mango) =

Edible fruit cultivar

Mangifera 'Graham'
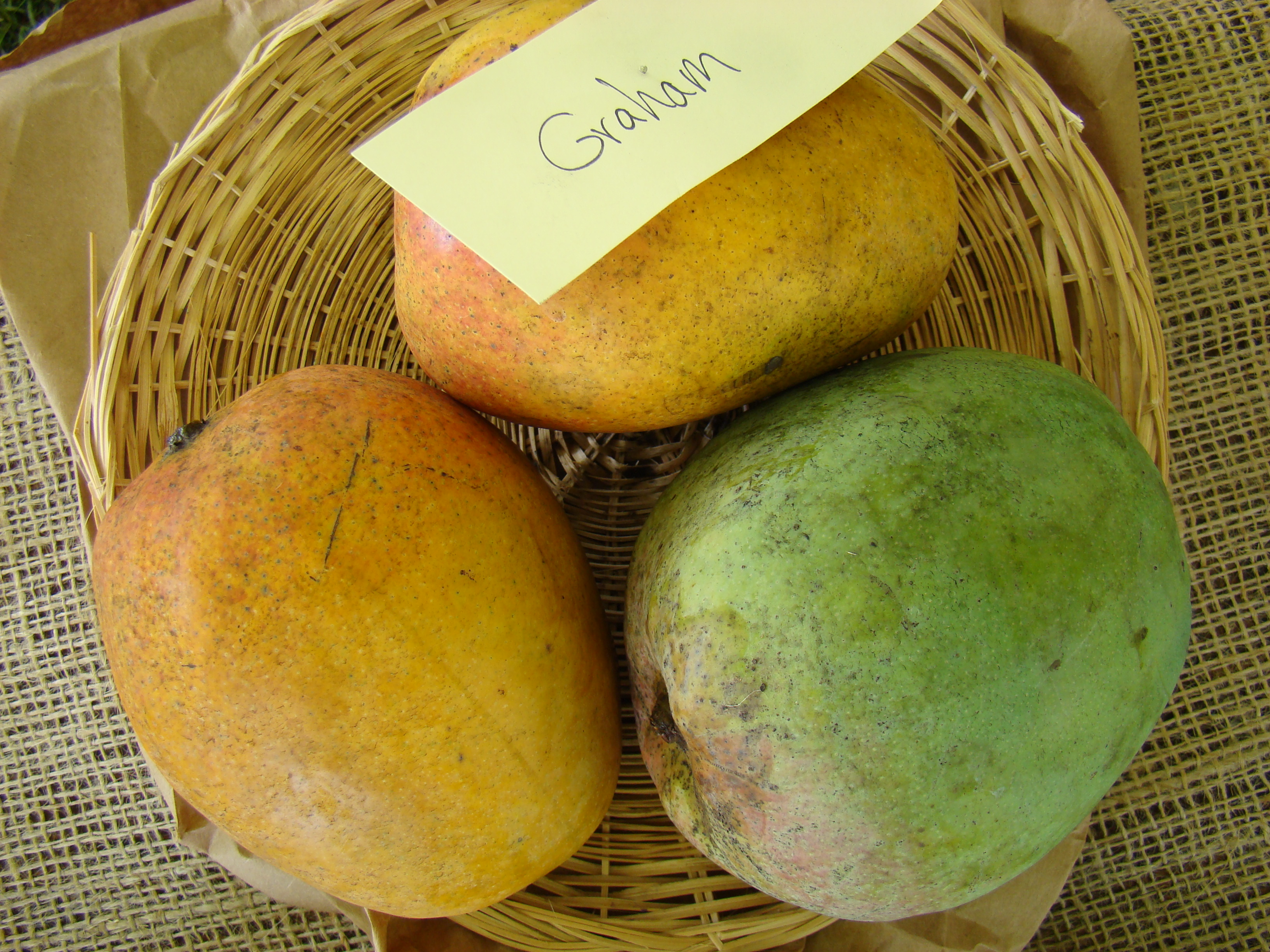
- Genus: Mangifera
- Species: Mangifera indica
- Cultivar: 'Graham'
- Origin: Trinidad from 'Julie' seed.

The 'Graham' mango is a named mango cultivar which originated in Trinidad.

== History ==
'Graham' was a seedling of the 'Julie' mango planted in Trinidad. In 1932 the variety was introduced to the United States by the USDA through Florida.

'Graham' has become a popular nursery stock tree in Florida for home growing due to its fine flavor and good disease resistance. It was selected as a curator's choice mango for Fairchild Tropical Botanic Garden's 2008 mango festival. The fruit is also popular in the Windward Islands.

'Graham' trees are now planted in the USDA's germplasm repository in Miami, Florida., the University of Florida's Tropical Research and Education Center in Homestead, Florida, and the Miami-Dade Fruit and Spice Park, also in Homestead.

== Description ==
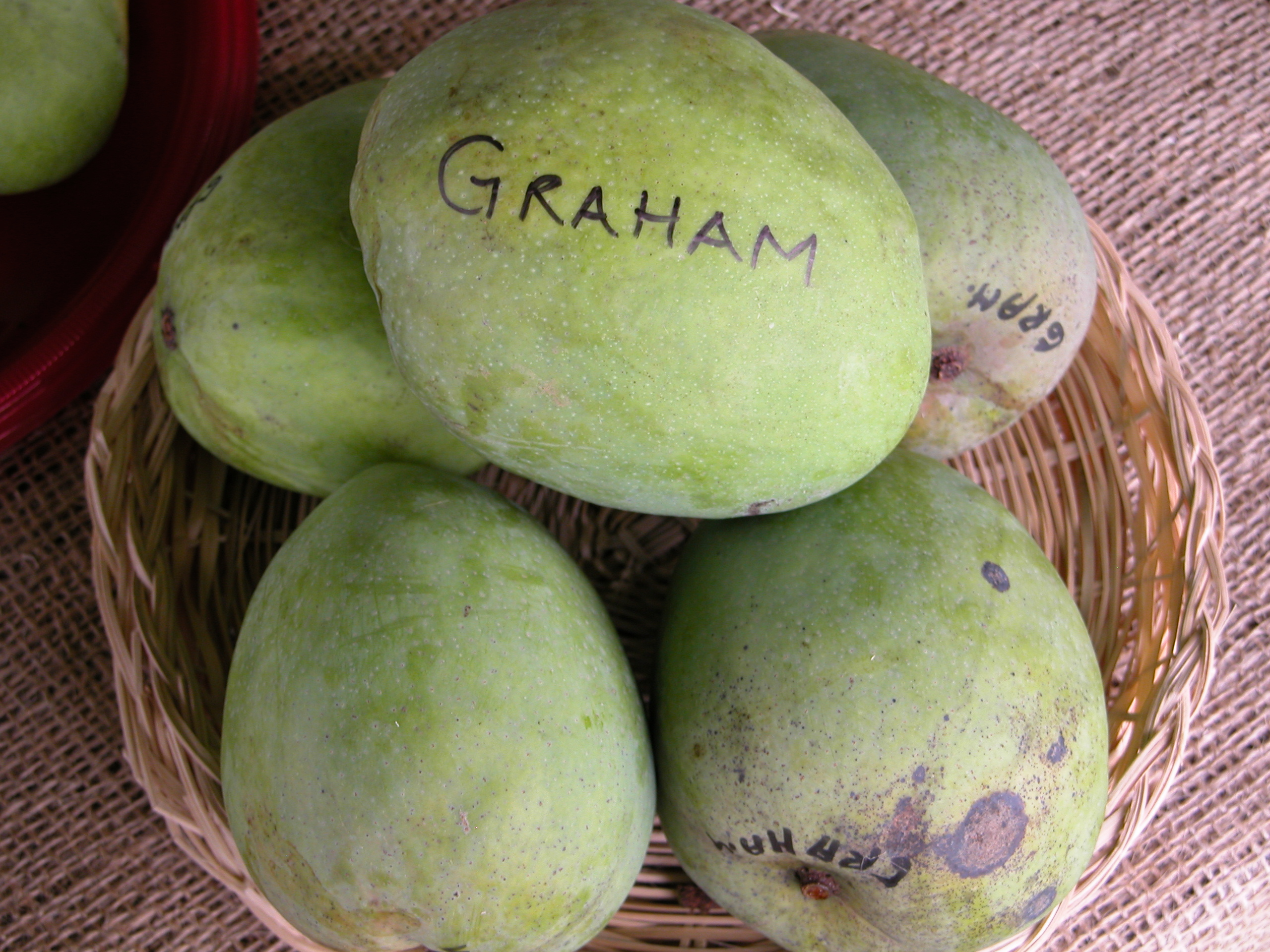
Display of unripe 'Graham' mangoes at the Tropical Agricultural Fiesta in the Fruit and Spice Park in Homestead, Florida.

The fruit is of oval shape, with a rounded apex that sometimes contains a small lateral beak. The skin is yellow at maturity, and is bumpy and undulating. The flesh is orange, fiberless, and has a rich and aromatic flavor with a resinous note. The fruit contains a monoembryonic seed, and typically matures from June to August in Florida.

Unlike its parent 'Julie', 'Graham' is a vigorous grower that reaches over 20 feet in height and forms a round, dense canopy.

== See also ==
- Video description of Graham by Dr. Jonathan Crane of the University of Florida's Tropical Research and Education Center
