= Honey Gold =

Mango cultivar

Mangifera 'Honey Gold'
- Genus: Mangifera
- Species: Mangifera indica
- Hybrid parentage: 'Kensington Pride' × unknown
- Cultivar: 'Honey Gold'
- Origin: Australia

The 'Honey Gold' mango is a named mango cultivar that is grown in Australia and known for its sweet flavor and fiberless flesh.

== History ==
Honey Gold was first produced in Queensland's Rockhampton region in 1991 as hybrid between Kensington Pride and an unknown variety. The Queensland-based Piñata Farms owns the rights to Honey Gold.

== Description ==
The fruit has a yellow-orange skin and an intense, punchy, distinctive sweet flavor.

== See also ==
- List of mango cultivars
