= Petti Amba =

Species of fruit and plant

Petti Amba (පෙට්‍ටි අඹ) is a variety of plant in the Mangifera (mango) genus of the family Anacardiaceae. It is now extreme rare and is called Petti Amba in Sinhala meaning 'Box Mango'. Petti Amba might be native or endemic to Sri Lanka.
