= Chinna rasalu =

Mango cultivar

Mangifera 'Chinna Rasalu'
- Genus: Mangifera
- Species: Mangifera indica
- Cultivar: 'Chinna Rasalu"
- Origin: Nuzvid, Andhra Pradesh, India

Chinna rasalu or Chinnarasamulu is an Indian mango variety originating in Nuzvid, Andhra Pradesh, India. It is a particularly juicy variety and it is grown across Andhra Pradesh and Telangana in Southern India.

Cheruku rasalu is a larger, sweeter version of the Chinna Rasalu. It is sweet as sugarcane, and in Telugu, the word for sugarcane is cheruku. Thus, It was referred to as the "Cheruku Rasalu".
