= Chok Anan =

Mango cultivar

Mangifera 'Chok Anan'
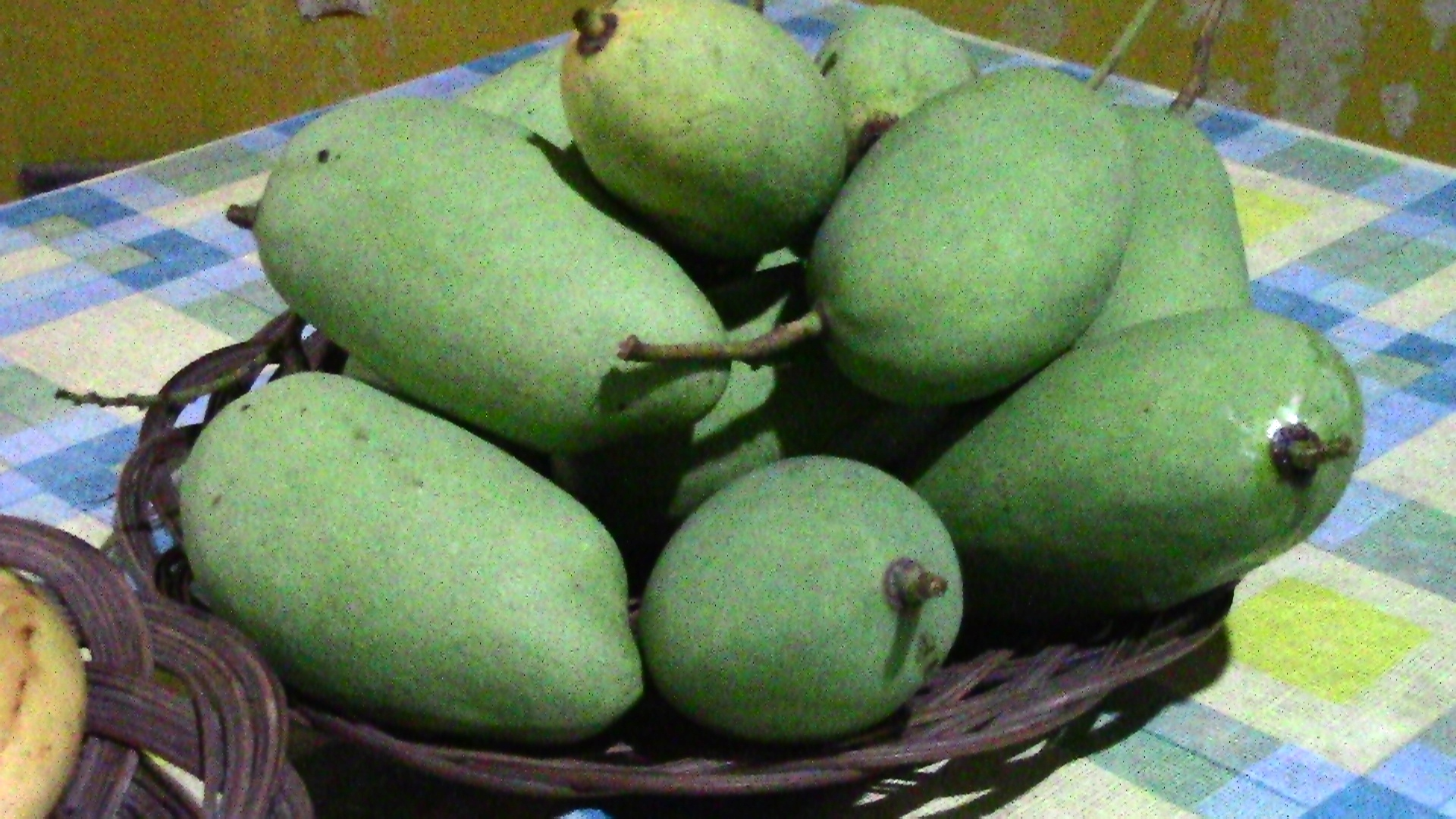
- Chok Anan mangoes waiting to ripen on a table.
- Genus: Mangifera
- Cultivar: 'Chok Anan'

The 'Chok Anan' mango, sometimes spelled Chocanon, (Thai: โชคอนันต์, pronounced [t͡ɕʰôːk ʔā.nān]) is a sweet mango from Thailand, India, Bangladesh and Pakistan. It has an oval shape and tapered tips. The ripe fruit and flesh are light yellow and have a sweet taste. Chok Anan is also called "honey mango".

== Gallery ==
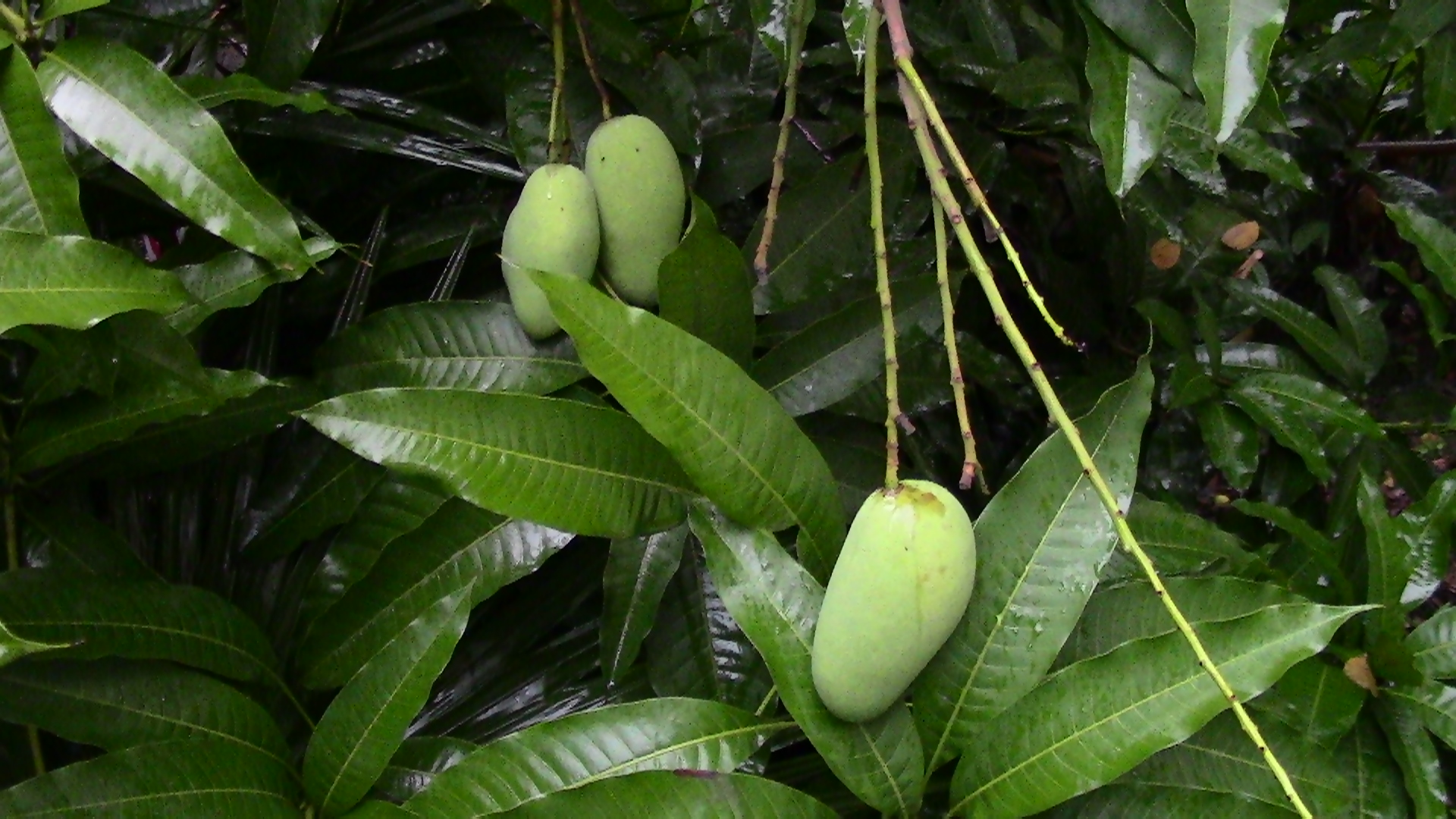
Chok Anan fruits on tree.

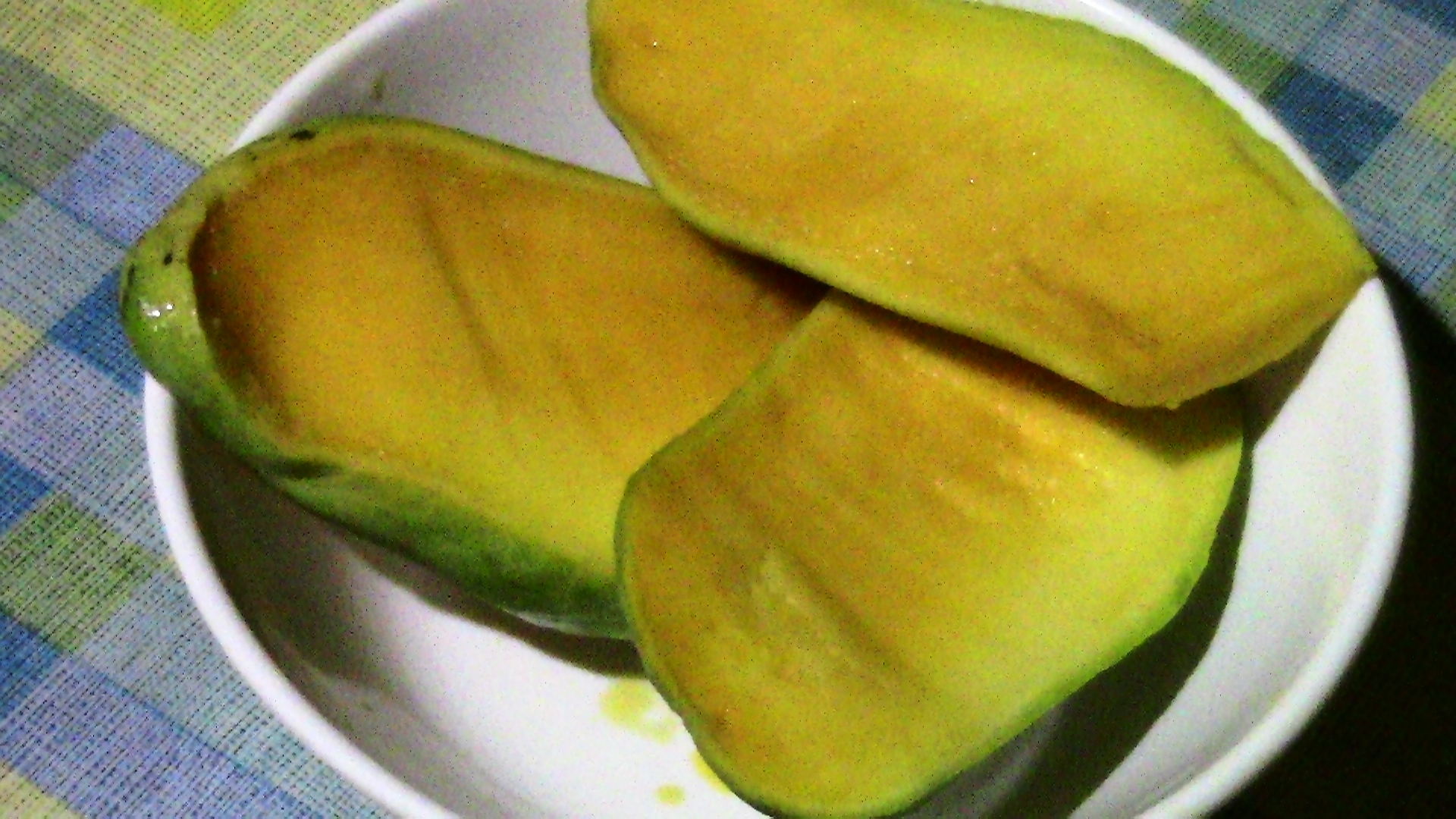
A semi-ripe Chok Anan cut into three parts. Notice the still greenish skin.

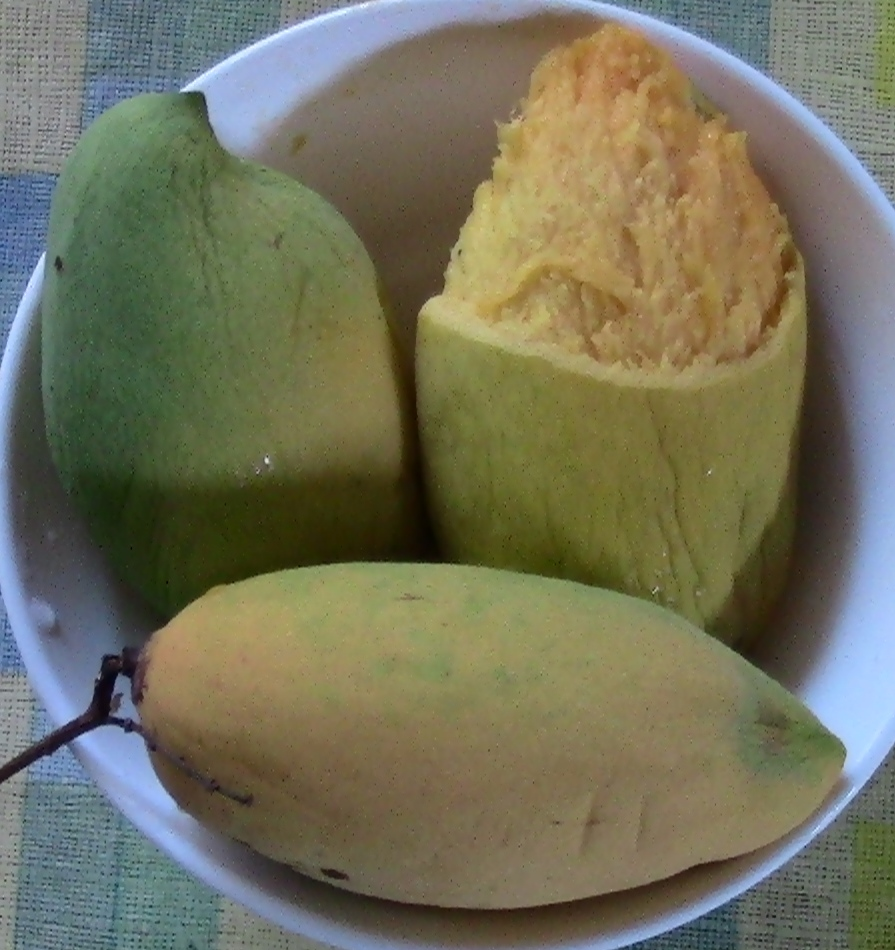
Semi-ripe but ready to eat Chok Anan mangoes.

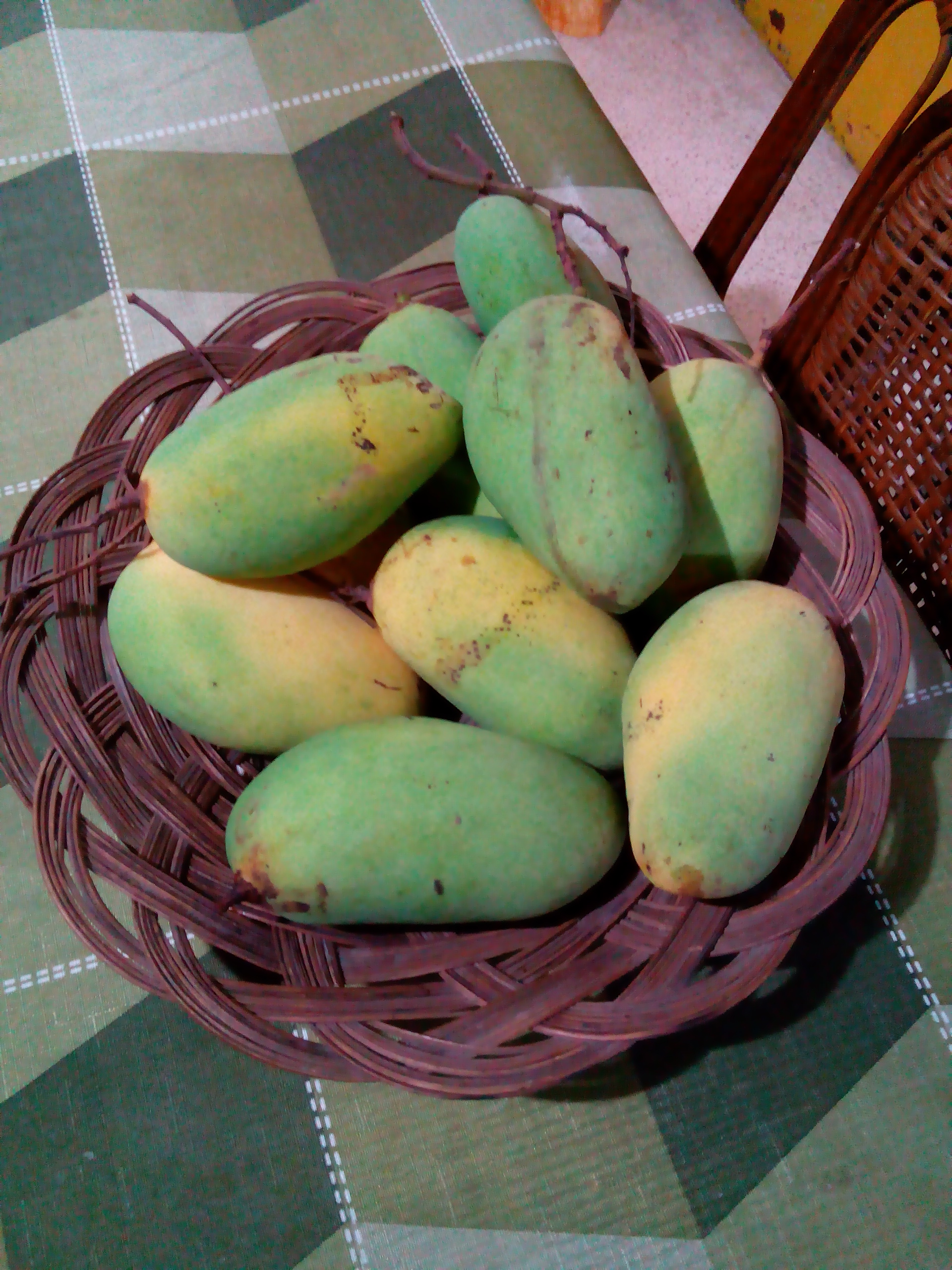
Chok Anan mangoes ripe enough for use as a salad ingredient.

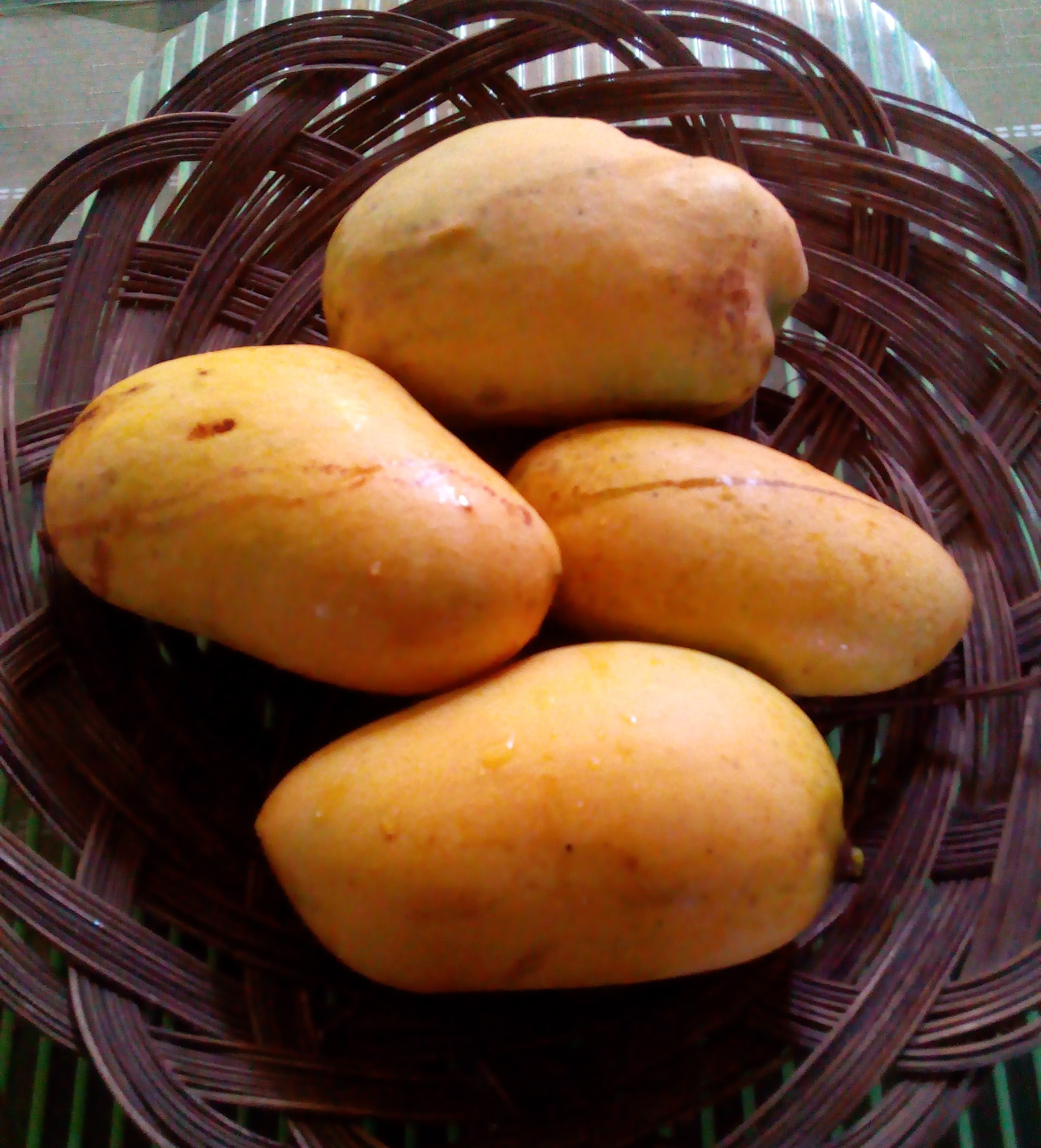
Fully ripe Chok Anan mangoes.

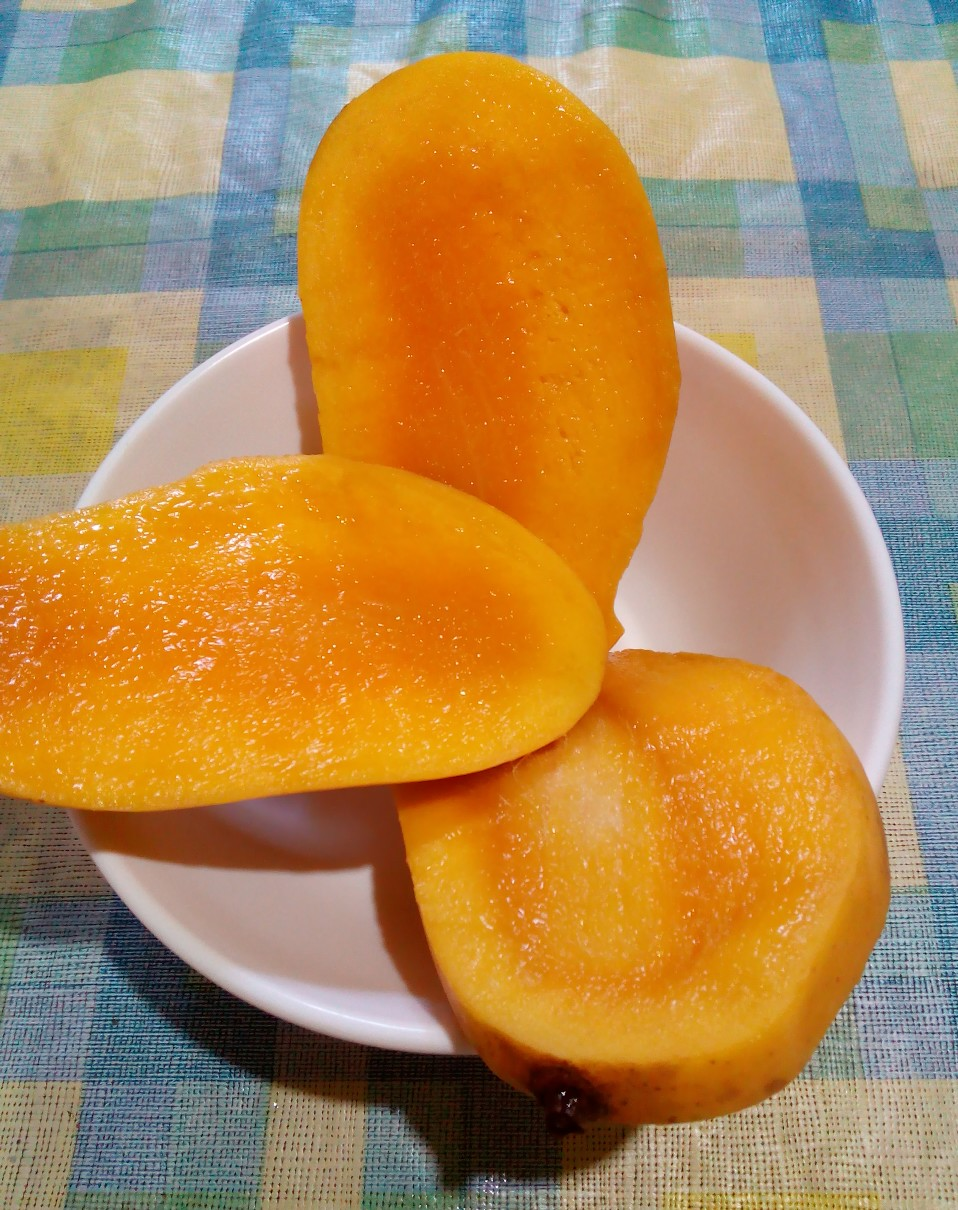
Fully ripe Chok Anan mango cut into three pieces.
