= Katchamitha mango =

Mango cultivar

Mangifera 'Katchamitha'
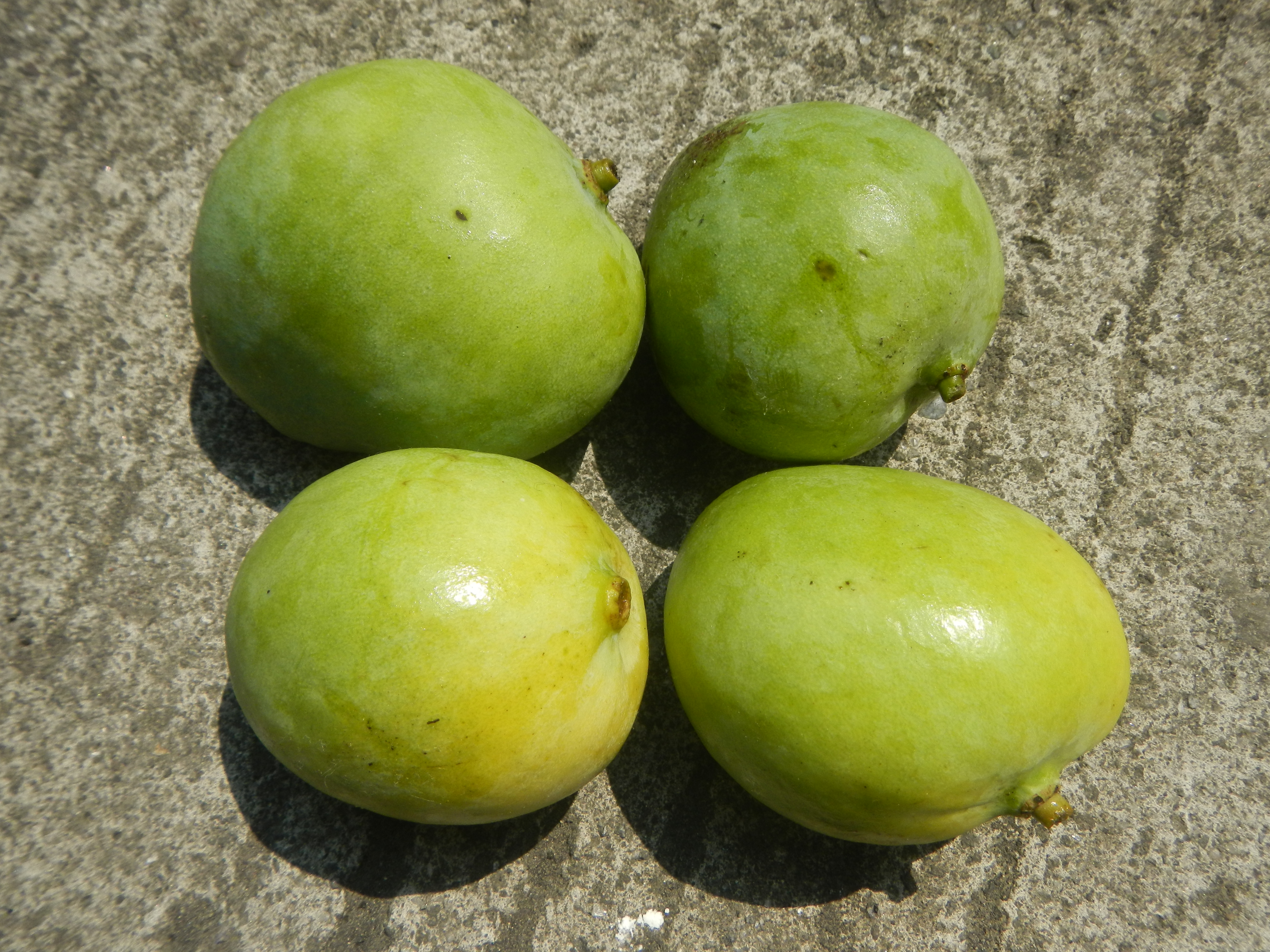
- Species: Mangifera indica
- Cultivar: 'Katchamitha'

The 'Katchamitha' mango is a mango cultivar originated in India. It is commonly known as Indian mango, and it has become one of the most common cultivars in the Philippines.

== Description ==
The fruit is a medium-sized, averaging less than a pound in weight at maturity. The skin color is green, with yellow blush when ripe. The fruit has a somewhat almost like an unusual shape that is ovate. The flesh is bright green-yellow, ripening from fibrous yellow flesh compared to the native carabao mango, with crispy and has a mildly sweet taste when green, and a sweet taste like banana when yellow.
