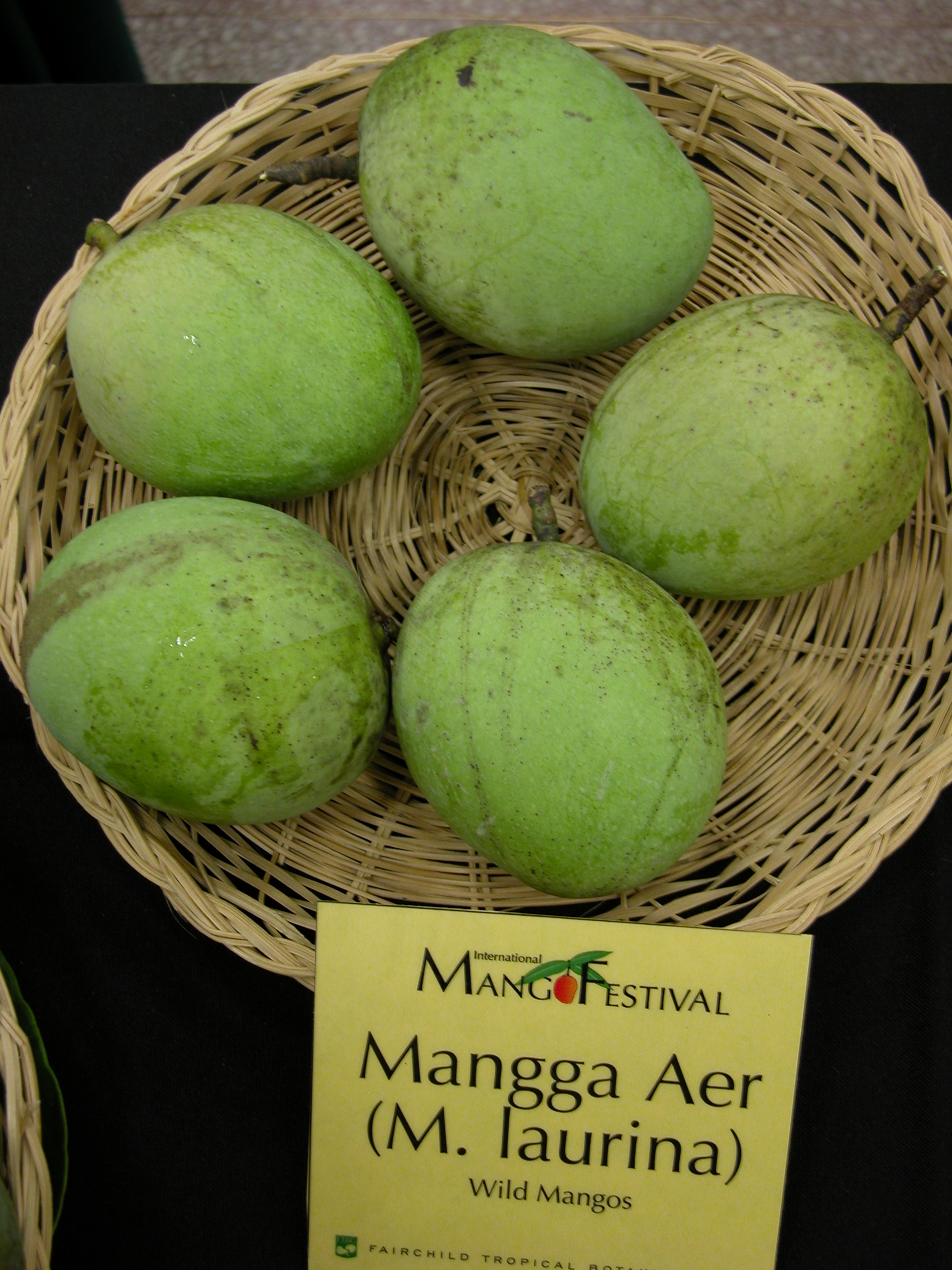

Scientific classification
- Kingdom: Plantae
- Clade: Tracheophytes
- Clade: Angiosperms
- Clade: Eudicots
- Clade: Rosids
- Order: Sapindales
- Family: Anacardiaceae
- Genus: Mangifera
- Species: M. laurina

Binomial name
- Mangifera laurina Blume, 1850

Synonyms
- Mangifera longipes Griff., 1854 Mangifera parih Miq., 859 Mangifera sumatrana Miq., 1859

= Mangifera laurina =

Species of fruit and plant

Mangifera laurina is a species of flowering plant in the family Anacardiaceae. It commonly known as mangga kopyor, mangga pari in Indonesian.
