= Mango production in Florida =

Mango production in the US state

Florida is the largest producer of mangoes in the United States.

== Production ==
Mango production happens in the southern part of Florida. The two primary types of mango grown in Florida are Indian and Indochinese. In the year 2000 there were about 165,000 fruit bearing trees.

== History ==
The first commercial mango orchard in Florida was planted in 1833. Mango growing and breeding was a hobby of wealthy men in South Florida including Henry Ford and Thomas Edison.

As a craft beer industry developed in Florida beers which included mango began to appear. In 2021 Florida was the largest producer of mangoes in the United States.

== Season ==
In the Florida Keys mango season is May-July.

== Risks ==
Outside of South Florida frost is an issue with Central Florida providing marginal production with adequate protection.

Variable weather can make the harvest unreliable. South Florida has significant hurricane risk.

== Culture ==
The Fairchild Tropical Botanic Garden in Coral Gables, Florida hosts the annual International Mango Festival.

Key West holds an annual Mango Festival, in the Keys a "mango fairy" is said to leave ripe mangoes for people.

== Breeding ==
Florida is home to a number of mango breeders. In the 21st century the University of Florida has used genetic profiling to improve the industry.

=== Varieties developed in Florida ===
- Alice (mango)
- Anderson (mango)
- Angie (mango)
- Bailey's Marvel
- Beverly (mango)
- Brooks (mango)
- Carrie (mango)
- Coconut Cream (mango)
- Cogshall (mango)
- Cushman (mango)
- Dot (mango)
- Duncan (mango)
- Earlygold
- Edward (mango)
- Eldon (mango)
- Fairchild (mango)
- Fascell
- Florigon
- Ford (mango)
- Glenn (mango)
- Haden (mango)
- Hatcher (mango)
- Irwin (mango)
- Jakarta (mango)
- Jean Ellen
- Keitt (mango)
- Kent (mango)
- Lippens (mango)
- Osteen (mango)
- Palmer (mango)
- Parvin (mango)
- Rosigold
- Ruby (mango)
- Sensation (mango)
- Sophie Fry
- Southern Blush
- Spirit of '76 (mango)
- Springfels
- Sunset (mango)
- Tommy Atkins (mango)
- Torbert (mango)
- Valencia Pride
- Van Dyke (mango)
- Young (mango)
- Zill (mango)

== See also ==
- Agriculture in Florida
- Tomato production in Florida
