= Eldon (mango) =

Mango cultivar

Mangifera 'Eldon'
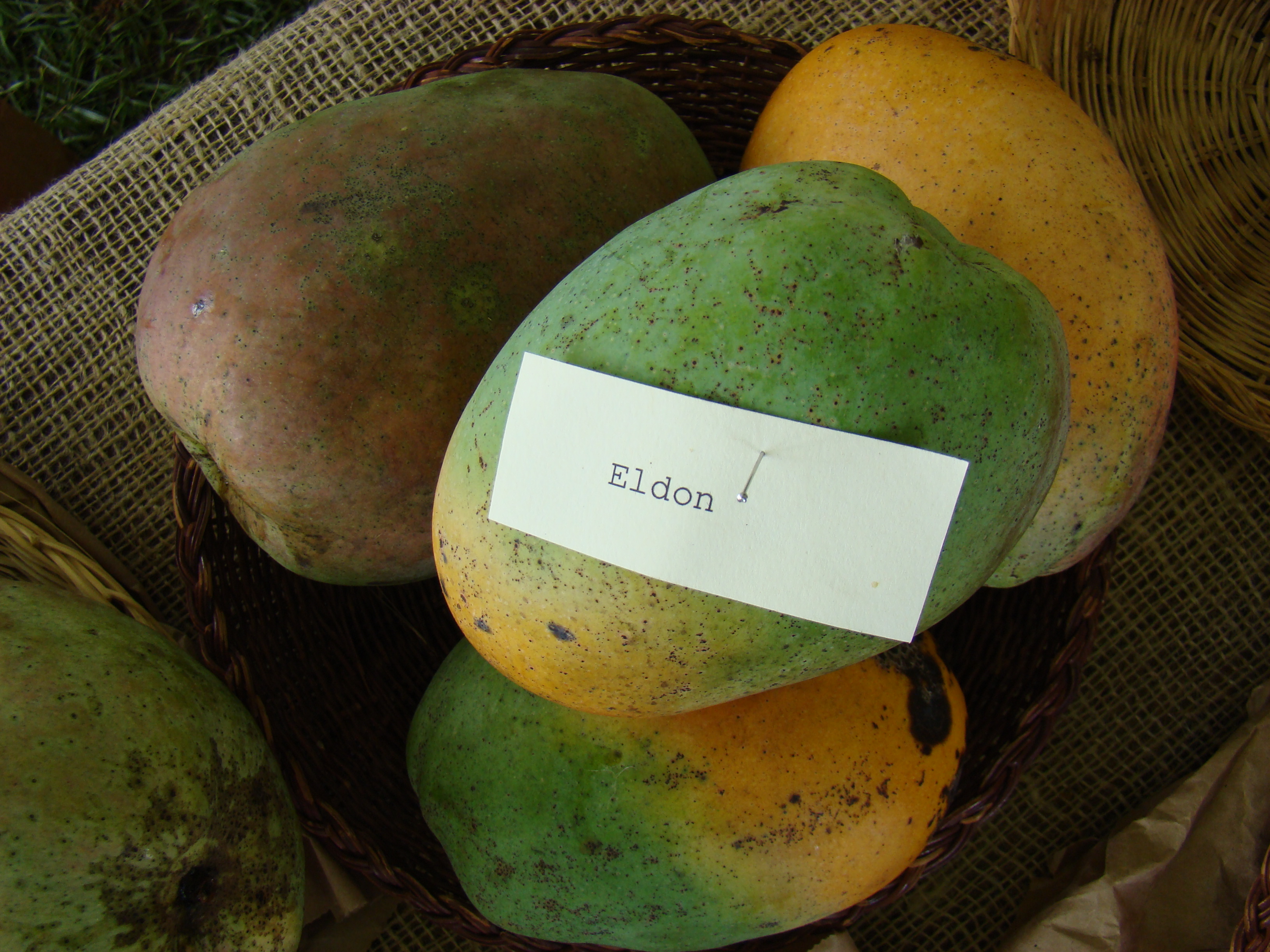
- Eldon mangoes at the Redland Summer Fruit Festival, Fruit and Spice Park, Homestead, Florida
- Genus: Mangifera
- Species: Mangifera indica
- Hybrid parentage: 'Cowasji Patel' × unknown
- Cultivar: 'Eldon'
- Breeder: Walter B. Eldon
- Origin: Florida, USA

The 'Eldon' mango is a mango cultivar which originated in south Florida, USA. Eldon eventually became a commercially adopted variety.

== History ==
The original tree was grown from a seed on the property of Walter B. Eldon in Miami, Florida in 1939. Reportedly the seed had been a Haden seed, and a 1995 analysis supported this; however a 2005 pedigree study did not support this, estimating that Eldon was likely a seedling of Cowasji Patel instead. The original tree first fruited in 1942. Propagation was begun around 1948 by Lawrence Zill and J.W. Chafer.

While Eldon did not become a popular nursery stock tree in Florida over the following decades, it did eventually gain commercial acceptance in Africa.

Eldon trees are planted in the collections of the USDA's germplasm repository in Miami, and the University of Florida's Tropical Research and Education Center in Homestead, Florida.

Eldon may have been a parent of the Southern Blush mango.

== Description ==
The fruit is of oval shape and averages about a pound in weight; moreover, the fruit may have variegated color upon maturity, and can be a mix of green, yellow, orange and red blush. The flesh is yellow and has a sweet flavor with a pleasant aroma. The fruit contains a monoembryonic seed.

The trees are moderately vigorous with a large canopy that contains light green leaves.
