= Beverly (mango) =

Mango cultivar

Mangifera 'Beverly'
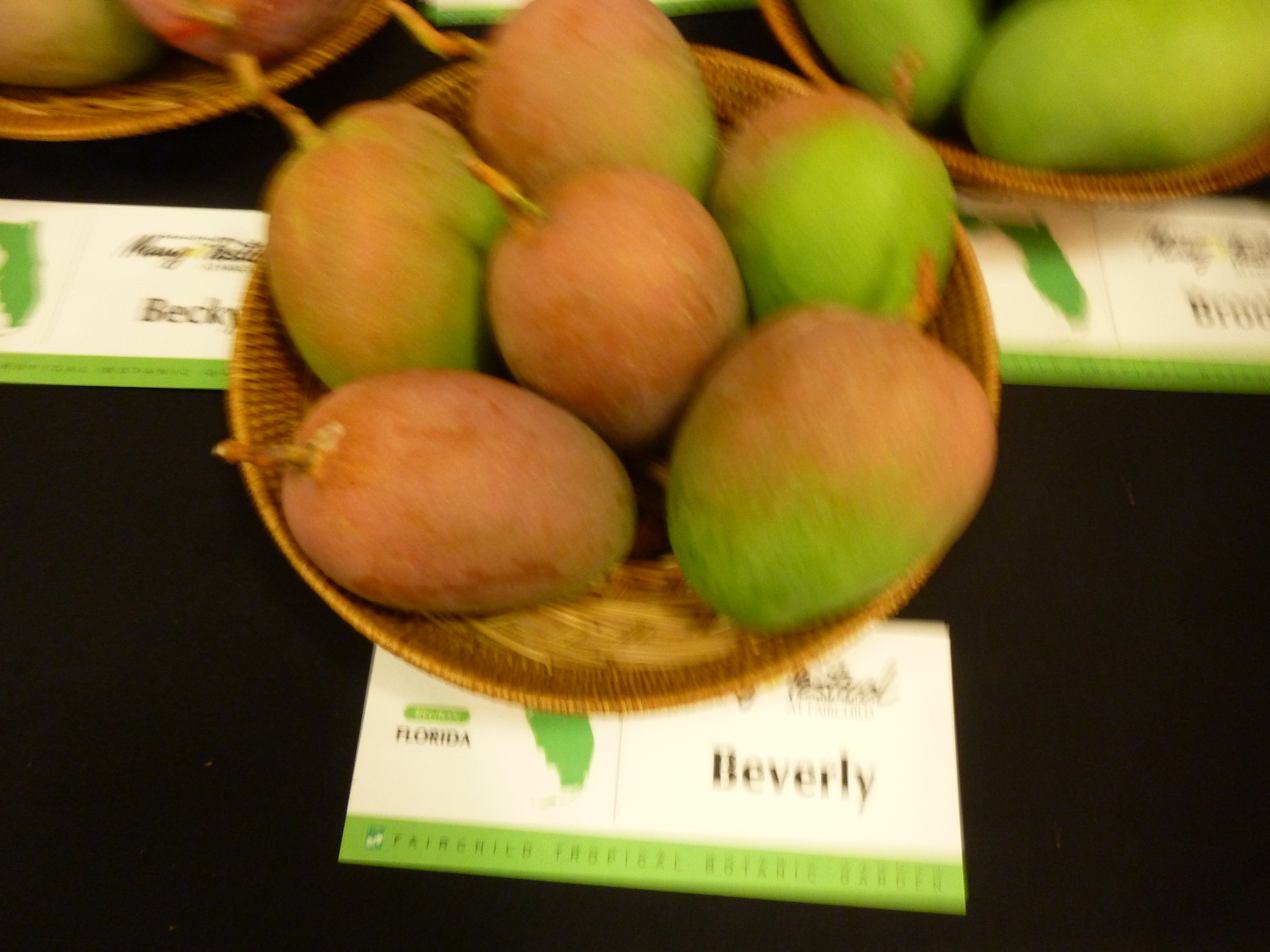
- Beverly mangoes at the 2010 Fairchild Tropical Botanic Garden's International Mango Festival in Coral Gables, Florida
- Genus: Mangifera
- Species: Mangifera indica
- Hybrid parentage: 'Cushman' × unknown
- Cultivar: 'Beverly'
- Origin: Florida, USA

The 'Beverly' mango (or, 'Beverley') is a named mango cultivar that originated in south Florida.

== History ==
Beverly was a reportedly a 'Haden' seedling selected by the Zill family of Boynton Beach, Florida. However, a 2005 pedigree analysis estimated that the 'Cushman' cultivar was the parent.

The cultivar did not gain widespread commercial acceptance due to the fruit's lack of color at maturity. However, it did gain popularity as a dooryard cultivar due to its flavor, disease resistance, and late ripening season, and is now sold as nursery stock in Florida. Beverly was selected as a curator's choice mango by the Fairchild Tropical Botanic Garden for their 2008 and 2009 mango festivals.

Beverly trees are planted in the collections of the USDA's germplasm repository in Miami, Florida, the University of Florida's Tropical Research and Education Center in Homestead, Florida, and the Miami-Dade Fruit and Spice Park, also in Homestead.

== Description ==
The fruit is of round to oval shape, with no or minimal lateral beak. Weight can vary between one and three pounds. At maturity, the fruit remains largely green with some yellow. The flesh has no fiber, is rich in flavor, and contains a monoembryonic seed. It ripens from July to August in Florida.

The tree has a low growth spreading habit, and can be kept under 20 feet.

== See also ==
- List of mango cultivars
