= Springfels =

Mango cultivar

Mangifera 'Springfels'
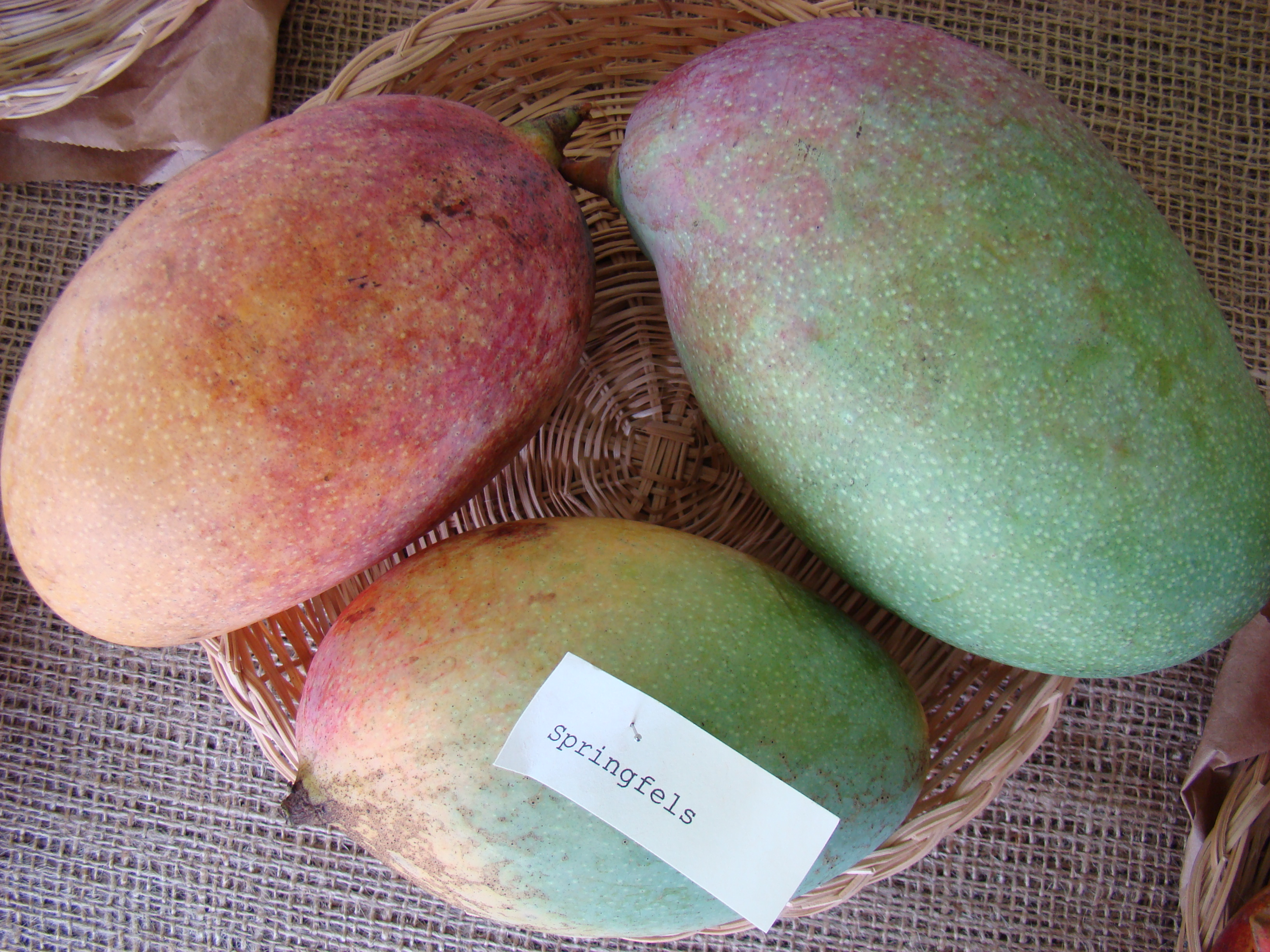
- Springfels mangoes at the Redland Summer Fruit Festival, Fruit and Spice Park, Homestead, Florida
- Genus: Mangifera
- Species: Mangifera indica
- Hybrid parentage: 'Haden' × unknown
- Cultivar: 'Springfels'
- Breeder: Charles F. Springfels
- Origin: Florida, US

The 'Springfels' mango is a large, commercially grown mango cultivar that originated in south Florida.

== History ==
Charles F. Springfels was a German immigrant to the United States who had established a jewelry manufacturing business in Buffalo, New York. When his health began to decline he moved to Florida, where he began experimenting with plants. At his property in West Palm Beach, Florida a mango seed was planted in 1919, and the tree first fruited in 1925. The fruit were quite large, reaching several pounds in weight, had good eating qualities and shipped well, giving it potential as a commercial variety. The Springfels mango was reportedly a Haden seedling, which was later supported by a 2005 pedigree analysis. Some literature and physical characteristics had suggested that it had been a cross with Sandersha, though the analysis did not support this. Charles Springfels originally gave the fruit the name 'Springfels Superior'.

Springfels was well-received at a time when few alternatives existed to the Haden cultivar. Charles Springfels himself promoted the fruit heavily, submitting them for display at the Chicago fair and even having a shipment of the fruit received by the White House in 1939. The variety received some commercial plantings beginning in 1930, but did not gain widespread favor as new cultivars came into existence. A drawback for growers was the susceptibility of Springfels fruit to uneven ripening. The variety continued to be sold as nursery stock however, and is still sold in Florida on a small scale.

Springfels trees are planted in the collections of the USDA's germplasm repository in Miami, Florida, the University of Florida's Tropical Research and Education Center in Homestead, Florida, and the Miami-Dade Fruit and Spice Park, also in Homestead. The original tree still stands in West Palm Beach.

== Description ==
The fruit is oblong in shape, with a rounded base and apex, normally lacking a beak. At maturity Springfels averages over a pound in weight. It can reach enormous size for a mango, as large as 4 pounds in some instances. The skin is bumpy and coloration is similar to Haden, with yellow background and red blush. The flesh is yellow, sweet, and aromatic with very light fiber and contains a monoembryonic seed. The fruit typically mature from July to August in Florida.

The tree is a moderately vigorous grower with a spreading, compact canopy, though the trees do not typically exceed 20 feet in height.

== See also ==
- List of mango cultivars
