= Valencia Pride =

Mango cultivar

Mangifera 'Valencia Pride'
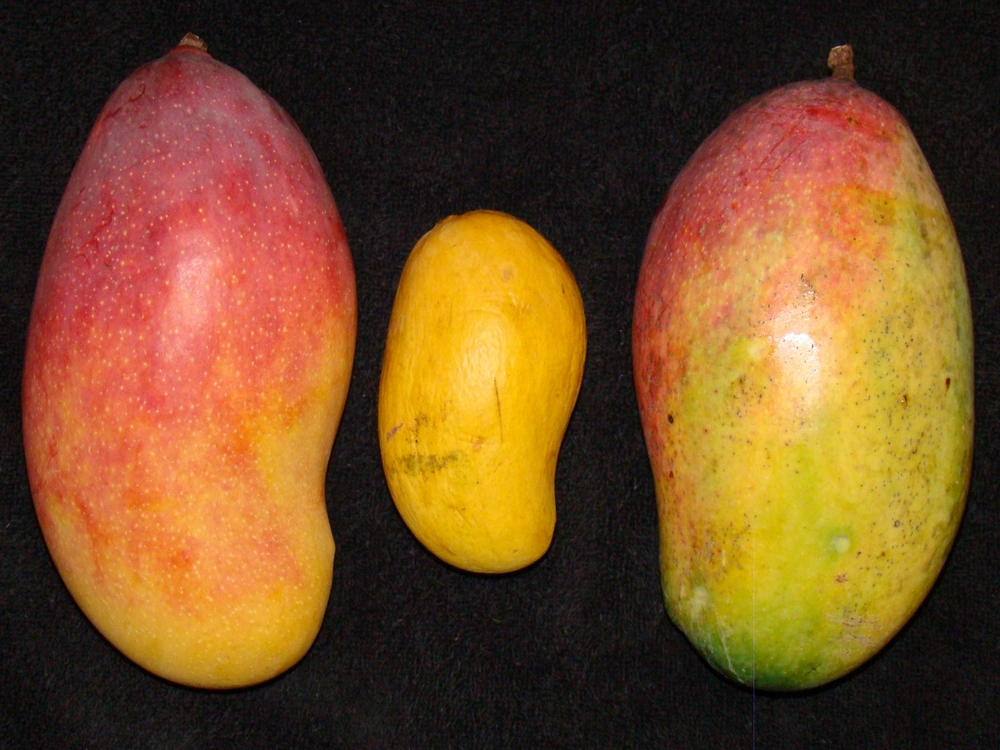
- 2 ripe Valencia Pride mangoes from the Ghosh Grove, Rockledge, Florida are shown on each side of a store-bought Ataulfo mango
- Genus: Mangifera
- Species: Mangifera indica
- Hybrid parentage: 'Haden' × unknown
- Cultivar: 'Valencia Pride'
- Origin: Florida, US

The 'Valencia Pride' mango is a named late-season mango cultivar that originated in south Florida.

== History ==
The original tree was reportedly grown from a Haden mango seed planted in 1937 on the property of Charles Brown in Miami, Florida. The tree first fruited in 1941. A 2005 pedigree analysis estimated that Haden was indeed the parent of Valencia Pride. Valencia Pride fruit was submitted for evaluation by the Florida Mango Forum and propagation was begun by the Zapiains of Miami.

Valencia Pride was recognized for its appearance, excellent production and eating qualities. Over the decades it was propagated throughout Florida both for home growing and commercial plantings. Today, Valencia Pride remains one of the more common nursery stock mangoes and is still grown on a limited commercial basis in Florida.

It has been selected as a "Curator's Choice" mango by the Fairchild Tropical Botanic Garden's International Mango Festival, most recently in 2009.

Valencia Pride trees are planted in the collections of the USDA's germplasm repository in Miami, Florida, the University of Florida's Tropical Research and Education Center in Homestead, Florida, and the Miami-Dade Fruit and Spice Park, also in Homestead.

Valencia Pride is also grown in the Coachella Desert in Mecca California.

== Description ==
The fruit has a sigmoid shape that is long and slender, with a rounded base and rounded apex, and a large apical beak. It is quite large and averages well over a pound at maturity, sometimes reaching 2 pounds. The skin is yellow with much of it typically covered in brilliant crimson blush. The flesh is yellow, nearly fiberless, firm and juicy, with a sweet flavor and aroma. It contains a monoembryonic seed in an elongated husk. The fruit typically ripens from July to August in Florida, making it a late-season cultivar. Fruit production is consistent and good, with the fruit being moderately fungus resistant.

The trees are very vigorous growers and have a reputation as being among the fastest growing of the Florida mangoes. They are capable of growing in excess of 50 feet in height if left unpruned, with large, open, and spreading canopies.

== See also ==
- List of mango cultivars
