= Ford (mango) =

Mango cultivar

Mangifera 'Ford'
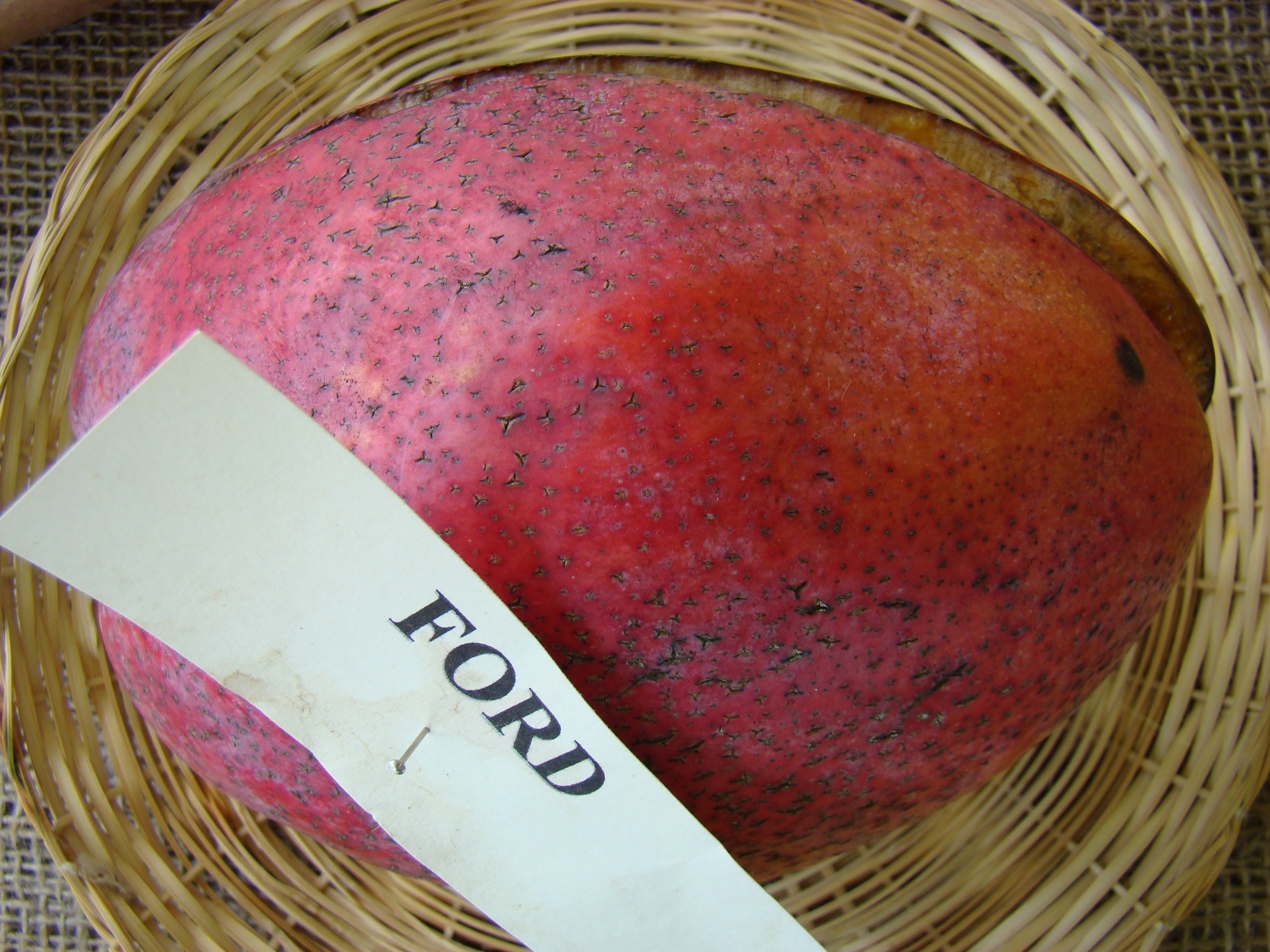
- A display of Ford mango at the Redland Summer Fruit Festival, Fruit and Spice Park, Homestead, Florida
- Genus: Mangifera
- Species: Mangifera indica
- Hybrid parentage: 'Tommy Atkins' × unknown
- Cultivar: 'Ford'
- Origin: Florida, USA

The 'Ford' mango is a named mango cultivar that originated in south Florida.

== History ==
Ford was of unknown origin until a 2005 pedigree study estimated that it was a seedling of Tommy Atkins.

The cultivar never gained popularity either as a commercial variety or a dooryard tree due to a high tendency of the fruit to split open while still on the tree, as well as lacking great eating quality.

Ford trees are planted in the collections of the USDA's germplasm repository in Miami, Florida, the University of Florida's Tropical Research and Education Center in Homestead, Florida, and the Miami-Dade Fruit and Spice Park, also in Homestead.

== Description ==
The fruit obtains large sizes and can be anywhere from 2 to 5 pounds at maturity.

== See also ==
- List of mango cultivars
