= Glenn (mango) =

Mango cultivar

Mangifera 'Glenn'
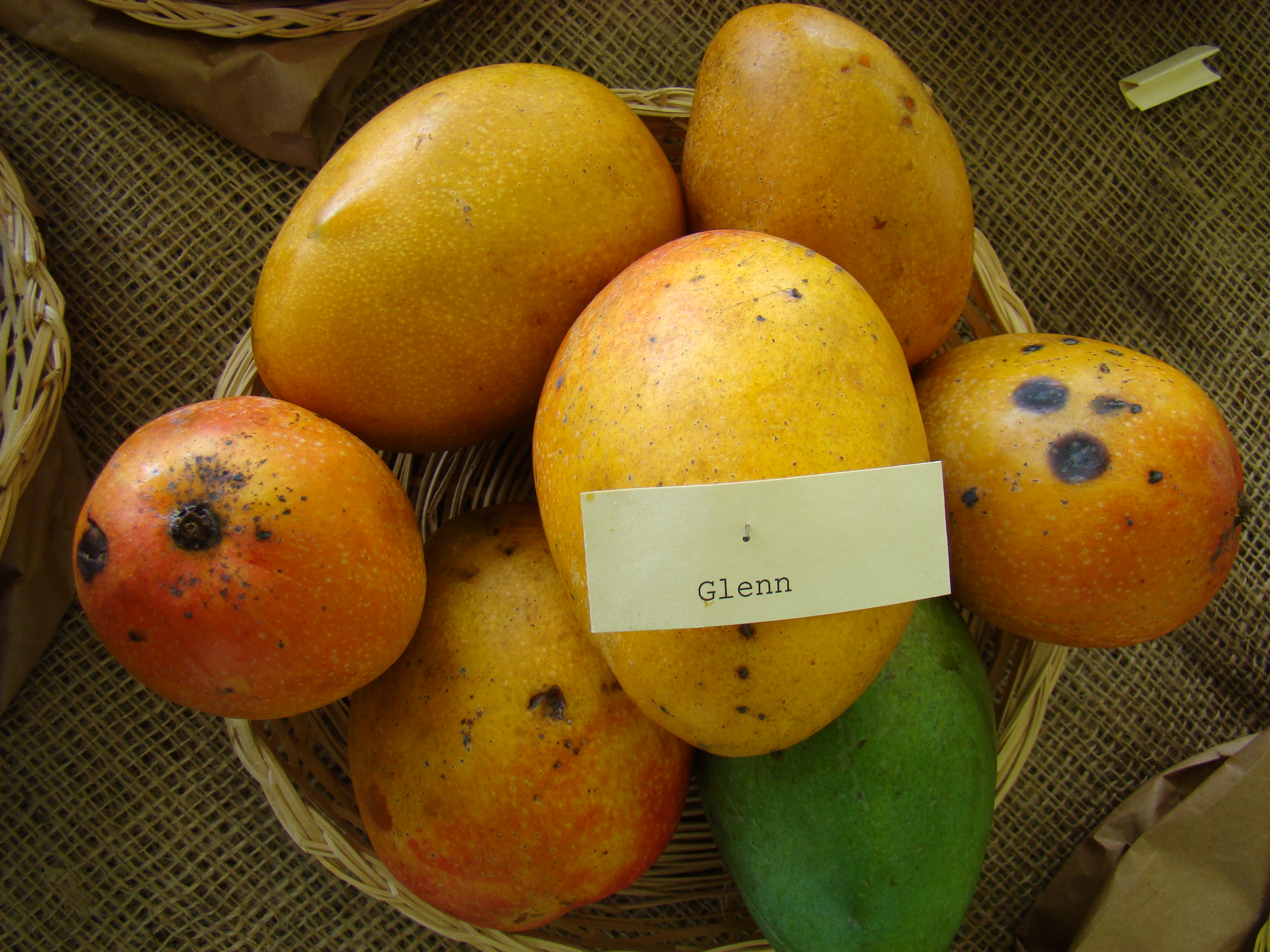
- Genus: Mangifera
- Species: Mangifera indica
- Cultivar: 'Glenn'
- Origin: Grown from a Saigon mango seed planted in Miami, Florida, in 1940.

The 'Glenn' mango is a mango cultivar that originated in South Florida.

== History ==
Glenn was reportedly a seedling of a Saigon that was planted in Miami, Florida in 1940. It was moved to the property of Victor L Munoz in 1943. The tree first produced fruit in 1945, and was found to be of good quality. While it was propagated thereafter in the state, it did not gain widespread commercial acceptance due to perceptions of lacking ideal storage characteristics. It would take several decades for the tree to become recognized for being a variety with positive characteristics that would make it a popular selection. Aside from the quality of the fruit, the tree could also be maintained at a reasonably small height and width (making pruning and harvesting easier), was moderately disease resistant, and usually produced a good-sized crop. Fruit matures 2–3 weeks before Haden, and tastes best while the skin is mostly green, becoming slightly more acidic as color develops. It is so low in fiber it can be eaten on the half-shell with a spoon.

Pedigree analysis has been conflicting on the true parentage of Glenn. Though originally publicized as a Haden seedling, a 1995 analysis disputed the Haden parentage, while a 2005 analysis found that Haden was indeed the most likely parent of Glenn. Though publicized as a Haden seedling, Roscoe Glenn himself later stated the cultivar was a seedling of Saigon. Color, flavor, and its monoembryonic trait lend evidence that Glenn was a Haden seedling however.

Glenn trees are planted in the collections of the USDA's germplasm repository in Miami, the University of Florida's Tropical Research and Education Center in Homestead, Florida, and the Miami-Dade Fruit and Spice Park, also in Homestead.

== Description ==
The tree is relatively small and produces a compact, rounded canopy. Trees can grow up to 30 feet tall but are often kept well under this height by regular pruning. They will generally begin producing fruit 3 to 4 years after planting, and thereafter will produce medium-to-large sized crops regularly.

The fruit is oval to oblong in shape, with a rounded base and a pointed apex which lacks a beak, and is usually within 300–600 g in weight. It has thin but tough skin which turns bright yellow when ripe. The fruit will develop an orange to red blush on 25–50% of its surface when exposed to the sun, while it remains completely yellow if in the shade. It has rich and sweet flavor and fiberless flesh (containing a monoembryonic seed), with a pleasant aroma. In Florida, the fruit matures from early June to early July.

== See also ==
- List of mango cultivars
