= Van Dyke (mango) =

Mango cultivar

Mangifera 'Van Dyke'
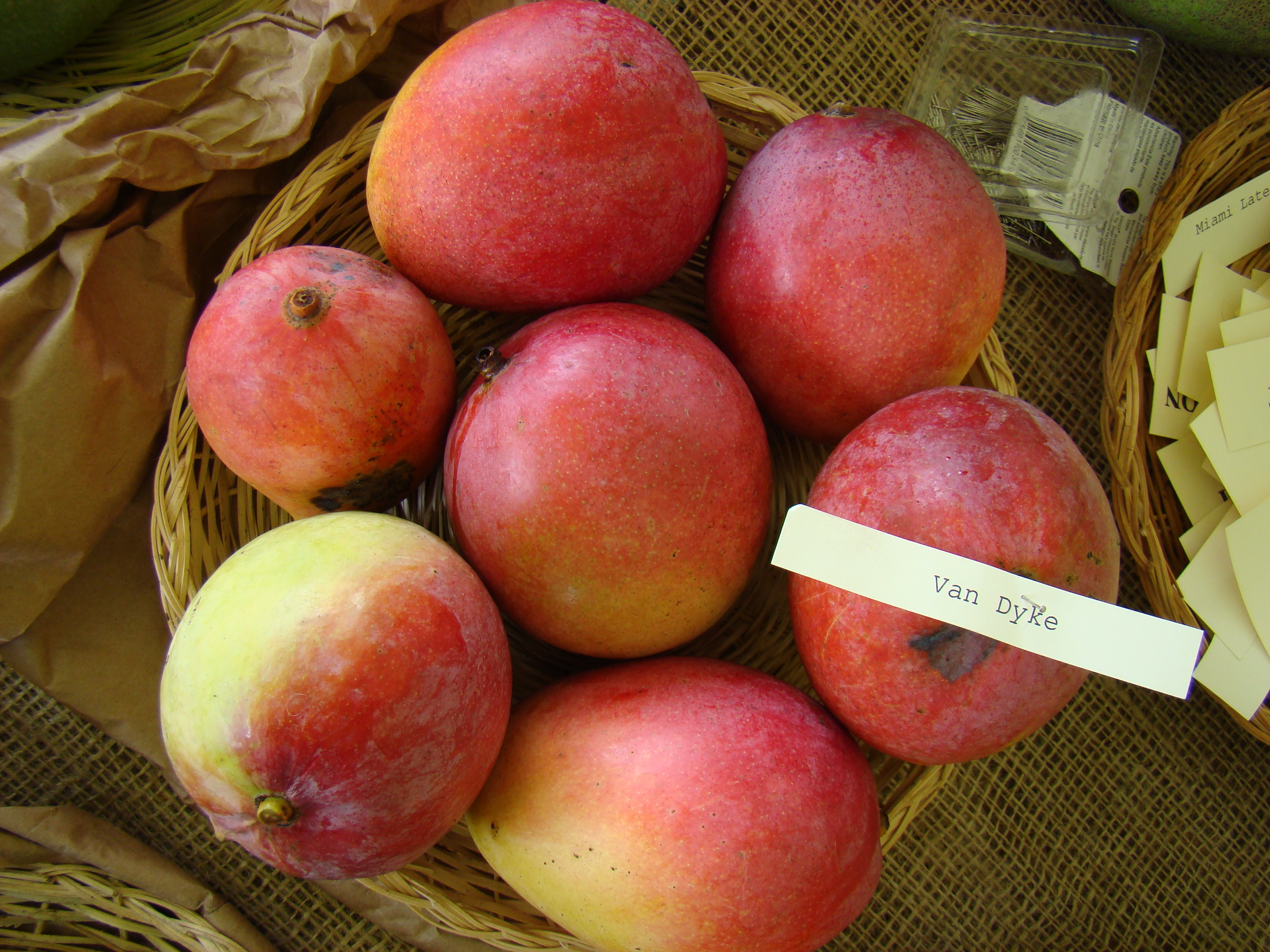
- Van Dyke mangoes at the Redland Summer Fruit Festival, Fruit and Spice Park, Homestead, Florida
- Genus: Mangifera
- Species: Mangifera indica
- Hybrid parentage: 'Haden' × unknown
- Cultivar: 'Van Dyke'
- Origin: Florida, US

The 'Van Dyke' mango is a named commercial mango cultivar that originated in south Florida.

== History ==
The original tree grew from a seed likely planted in the 1930s on the property of Madeline Van Dyke in Miami, Florida. For decades the parentage of Van Dyke was unknown, though a 2005 pedigree analysis estimated that Haden was the likely parent. The tree began fruiting in the 1940s and was found to have enough potential to be propagated during the 1950s, and by 1955 the Flagg Brothers Nursery had sold several hundred trees. That same year Van Dyke was submitted to the Florida Mango Forum for evaluation.

Van Dyke was recognized for its superior color and eating quality, and limited commercial plantings began in the 1960s and increased over the following two decades. Its commercial potential was considered limited in Florida due to the fruit's relatively small size and susceptibility to internal breakdown, but Van Dyke was later introduced to Brazil and eastern Africa and found commercial success being exported to Europe.

Today, Van Dyke is still sold as a nurserystock tree for home growing in Florida, and is grown on a small commercial scale. Van Dyke trees are planted in the collections of the USDA's germplasm repository in Miami, the University of Florida's Tropical Research and Education Center in Homestead, Florida, and the Miami-Dade Fruit and Spice Park, also in Homestead.

== Description ==
The fruit is of oval shape with a rounded base and a bluntly pointed apex. Most will have a small lateral beak. They average under a pound at maturity, with smooth yellow skin color and bright red blush. The flesh is yellow with minimal fiber, and has a rich and sweet flavor and aroma. It contains a monoembryonic seed. The fruit typically ripen from June to July in Florida, and production is considered to be good. Van Dyke is moderately fungus resistant.

The tree is a moderately vigorous grower with an open, spreading canopy.

== See also ==
- List of mango cultivars
