= Hatcher (mango) =

Mango cultivar

Mangifera 'Hatcher'
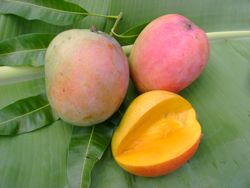
- Genus: Mangifera
- Hybrid parentage: 'Haden' × 'Brooks'
- Cultivar: 'Hatcher'
- Origin: Florida, US

The 'Hatcher' mango is a named commercial mango cultivar that originated in south Florida.

== History ==
The original tree was grown from seed on the property of nurseryman John Hatcher in Lantana, Florida and was selected during the 1940s. A 2005 pedigree analysis indicated that Hatcher was likely a cross between the Haden and Brooks cultivars. John Hatcher's grove continues in operation throughout the decades selling the Hatcher mangoes and trees. Today, the grove is still in operation at its original location and ships mangoes nationwide.

Examples of Hatcher have been planted at the USDA's germplasm collection, the Miami-Dade Fruit and Spice Park in Homestead, Florida.

== Description ==
The Hatcher fruit skin is yellow in color at maturity often with a pink blush. The fruits average over three pounds in weight and are large compared to most mangoes, with an oval shape and lacking a beak. The flesh is fiberless and orange–yellow in color with a mild, sweet flavor. Hatcher contains a monoembryonic seed, and the fruit typically matures from July to August in Florida.

The trees reach large sizes and are vigorous growers with dense canopies.
