= Osteen (mango) =

Mango cultivar

Mangifera 'Osteen'
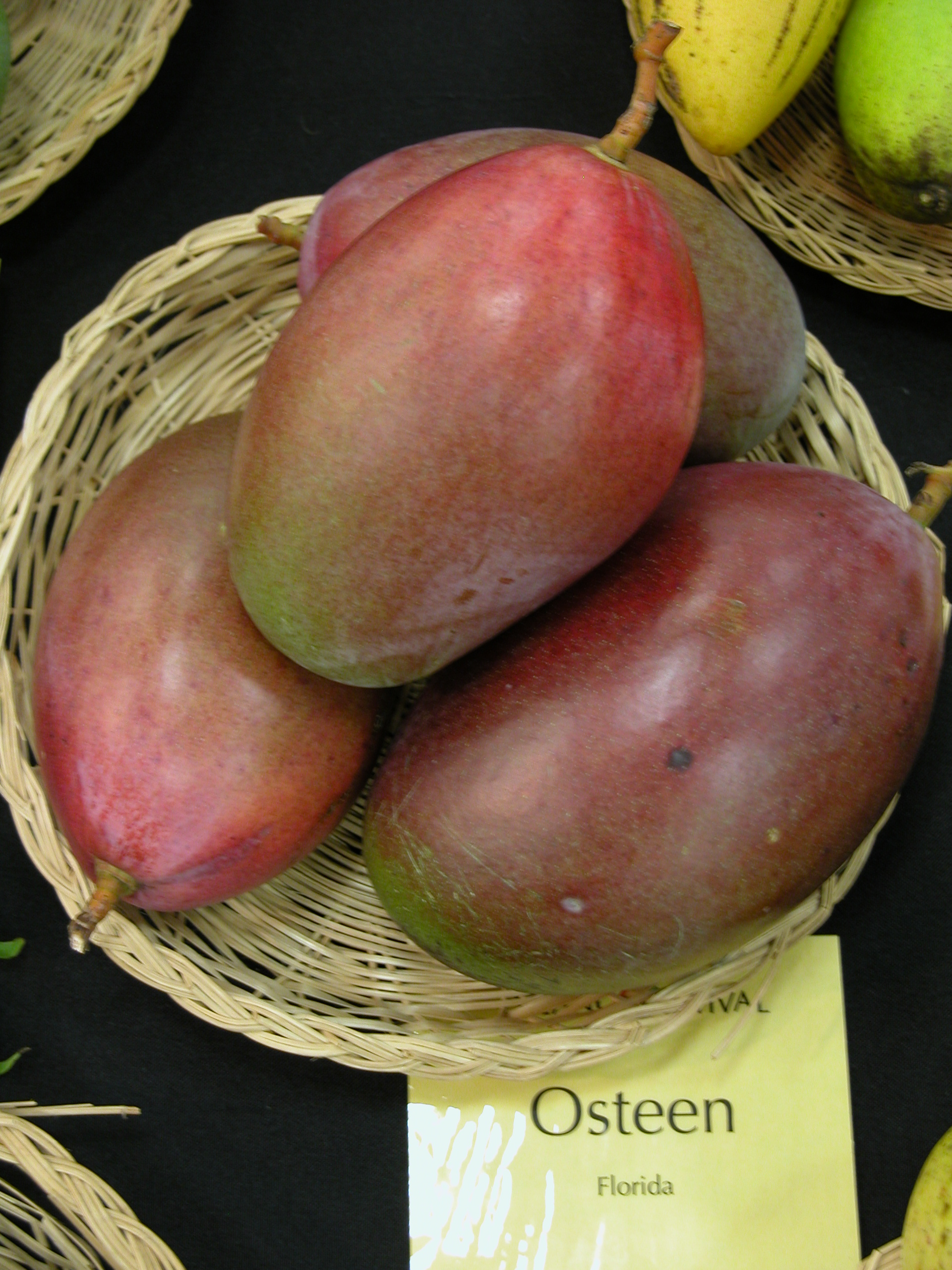
- 'Osteen' mangoes on display
- Genus: Mangifera
- Hybrid parentage: 'Haden' × unknown
- Cultivar: 'Osteen'
- Origin: Florida, US

The 'Osteen' mango is a commercial mango cultivar that originated in Merritt Island, Florida.

== History ==
The original tree grew from a seed planted in 1935 on the property of S.A. Osteen, the first County Commissioner of Brevard County, Florida. Osteen was reportedly a seedling of Haden, which pedigree analysis later supported. The tree first fruit in 1940 and was named after the well known Osteen family that lived in the Lotus subdivision on South Tropical Trail in Merritt Island, Florida since the late 19th century. The descendants still live there to date.

Osteen was evaluated for commercial use and later adopted as a commercial cultivar due to its color, production characteristics, and flavor. Today it is a favored cultivar in Europe and is still grown on a small commercial scale in Florida on Merritt Island.

Osteen trees are planted in the collections of the USDA's germplasm repository in Miami, Florida and the Miami–Dade Fruit and Spice Park in Homestead, Florida.

== Description ==
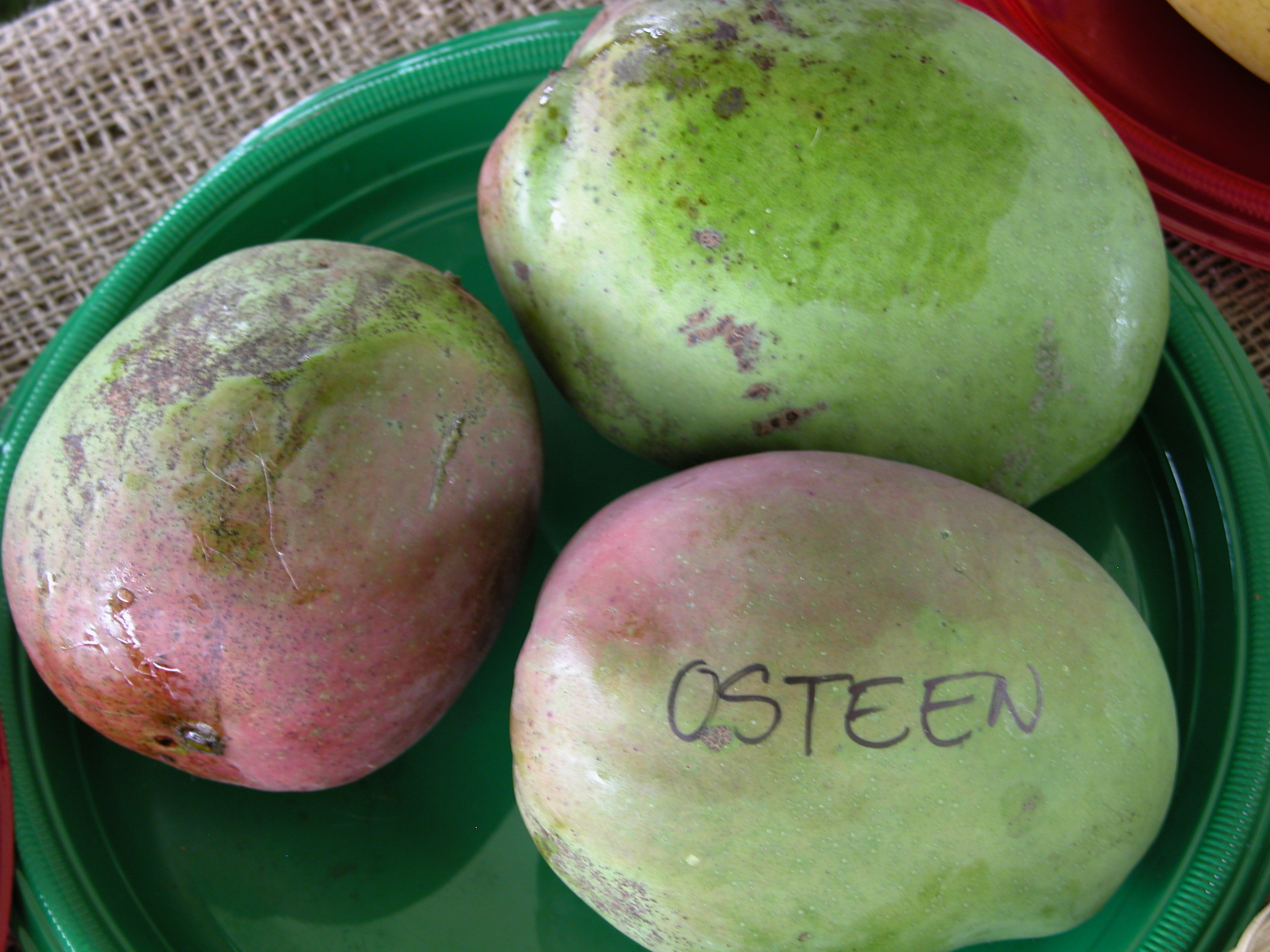
'Osteen' mango

The fruit is of oblong shape with a rounded base and apex that sometimes contains a small beak. It averages a little over a pound in weight at maturity. The smooth skin has a yellow background color but usually turns dark purple. The flesh is nearly fiberless and has a mild yet sweet flavor. The fruit contains a monoembryonic seed. It typically matures from July to September in Florida.

The trees are vigorous growers and produce dense canopies.
