= Cogshall =

Cogshall may refer to:

- 1764 Cogshall, an asteroid which was discovered by the Indiana Asteroid Program
- Cogshall Hall, a country house near the village of Comberbach, Cheshire, England
- Cogshall (mango), a mango cultivar that originated in southwest Florida
