= Anderson (mango) =

Mango cultivar

Mangifera 'Anderson'
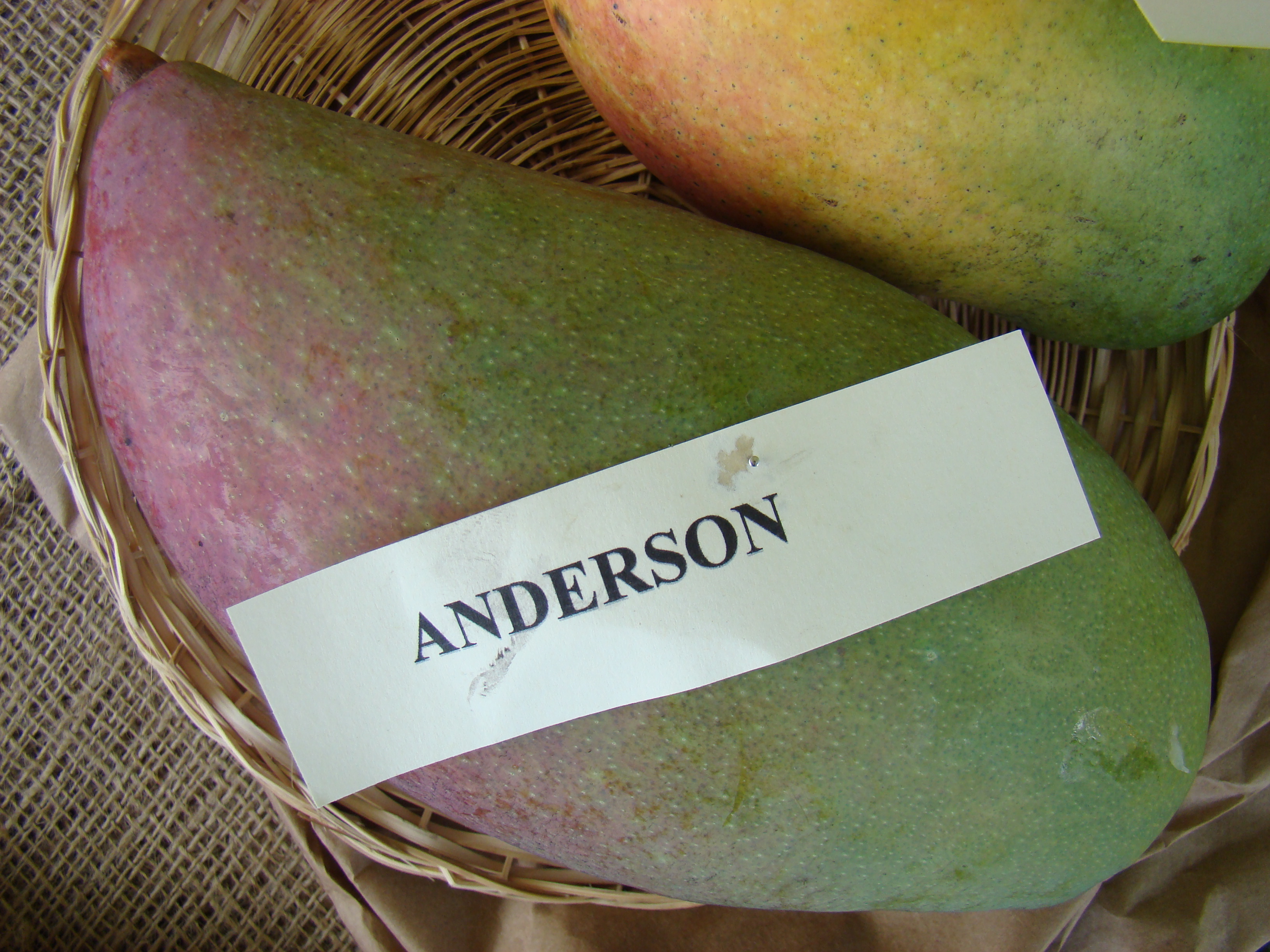
- The display of Anderson mango at the Redland Summer Fruit Festival, Fruit and Spice Park, Homestead, Florida
- Genus: Mangifera
- Species: Mangifera indica
- Hybrid parentage: 'Sandersha' × 'Haden'
- Cultivar: 'Anderson'
- Origin: Miami, Florida, US

The 'Anderson' mango is a named mango cultivar that originated in south Florida.

== History ==
The original tree was started from a 'Sandersha' mango seed sent from Jamaica in 1926 and was planted on the L. F Anderson's property in Miami, Florida. The tree fruited in 1931 and was named in 1948. A 2005 pedigree analysis estimated that 'Anderson' was a cross between the 'Sandersha' and 'Haden' cultivars. Anderson did not become a popular commercial variety due to the fruit's tendency to split while still on the tree. Its dooryard adaptation was limited as well, though it has been used to make chutneys.

'Anderson' trees are planted in the collections of the University of Florida's Tropical Research and Education Center in Homestead, Florida as well as the Miami-Dade Fruit and Spice Park, also in Homestead.

== Description ==
The fruit is large in size, averaging over one pound in weight. Its shape is similar to 'Sandersha', being long and slender, containing a small lateral beak. The skin is thick and has a green to yellow color with some crimson blush. The flesh is yellow, acidulous and mild in flavor, without fiber and containing a monoembryonic seed. It ripens from July to August in Florida.

The tree is a vigorous grower with a large, semi-open canopy.
