= Ruby (mango) =

Mango cultivar

Mangifera 'Ruby'
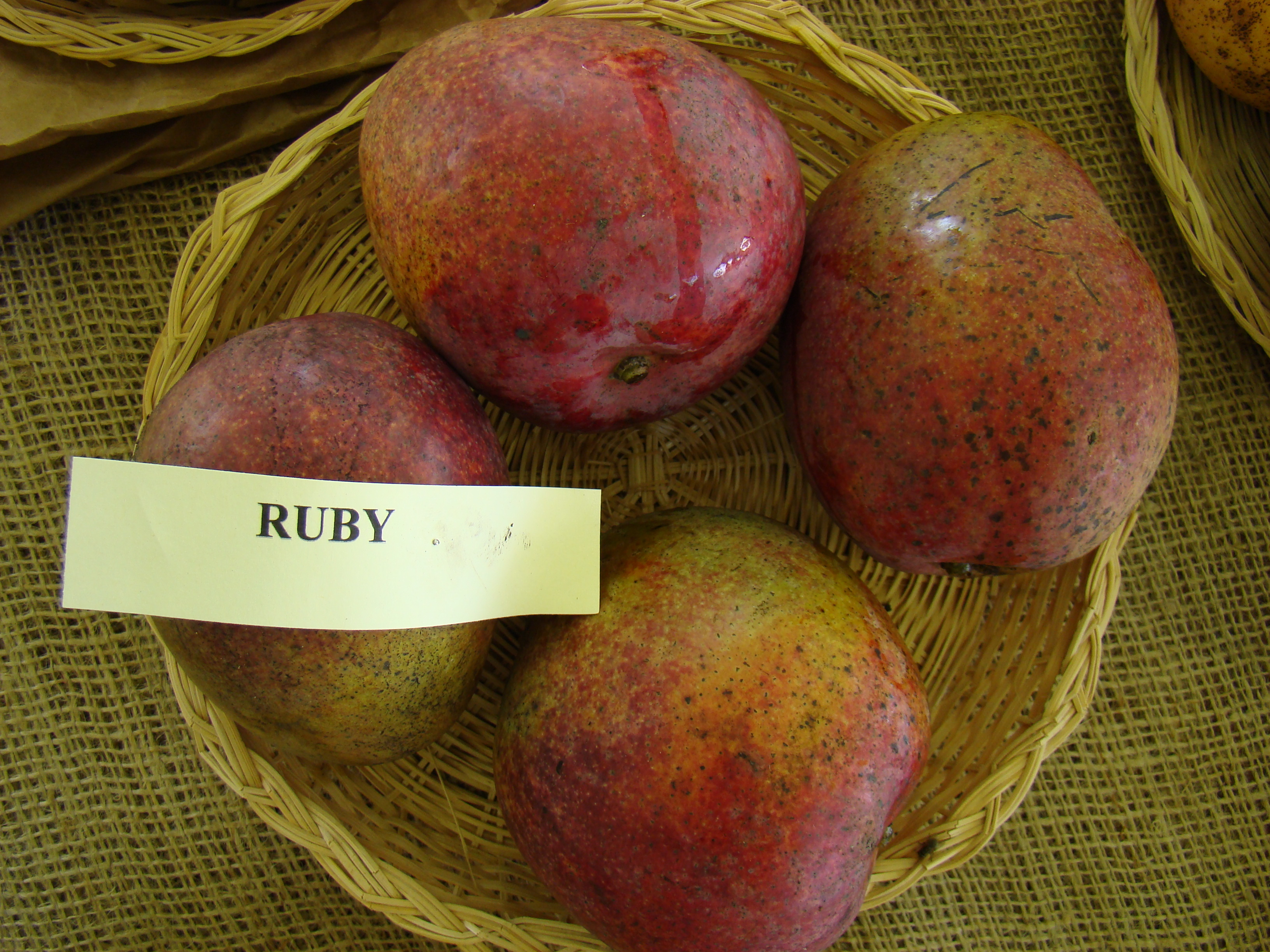
- 'Ruby' mangoes at the Redland Summer Fruit Festival, Fruit and Spice Park, Homestead, Florida
- Genus: Mangifera
- Species: Mangifera indica
- Hybrid parentage: 'Haden' × unknown
- Cultivar: 'Ruby'
- Origin: Florida, US

The 'Ruby' mango is a named mango cultivar that originated in south Florida and is known for its bright red color.

== History ==
The original 'Ruby' tree was grown from a seed on the property of Ed P. Davis in Miami, Florida. It was named in 1948, when it was first evaluated by the variety committee of the Florida Mango Forum, and first propagated by Davis the same year. In the decades following, the parentage of the Ruby was unknown but recent pedigree analysis estimates that it likely had Haden in its parentage.

Ruby would never be heavily propagated in the state, but two grafted trees were planted at the University of Florida's Tropical Research and Education Center, as well as the USDA's National Clonal Repository in Miami. From these locations bud wood for the Ruby was sent to different countries for commercial evaluation. It is now grown on some commercial scale in Africa.

== Description ==
The fruit is oblong in shape and small at maturity, averaging under a pound in weight. They develop a brilliant crimson blush covering most of the fruit. The yellow flesh has minimal fiber and a rich and spicy-sweet flavor with a strong aroma. Ruby contains a monoembryonic seed and the fruit are often born in clusters. The fruit typically matures from July to August in Florida.

The trees are moderately vigorous growers, developing large, upright, and open canopies.

== See also ==
- List of mango cultivars
