= Palmer (mango) =

Mango cultivar

Mangifera 'Palmer'
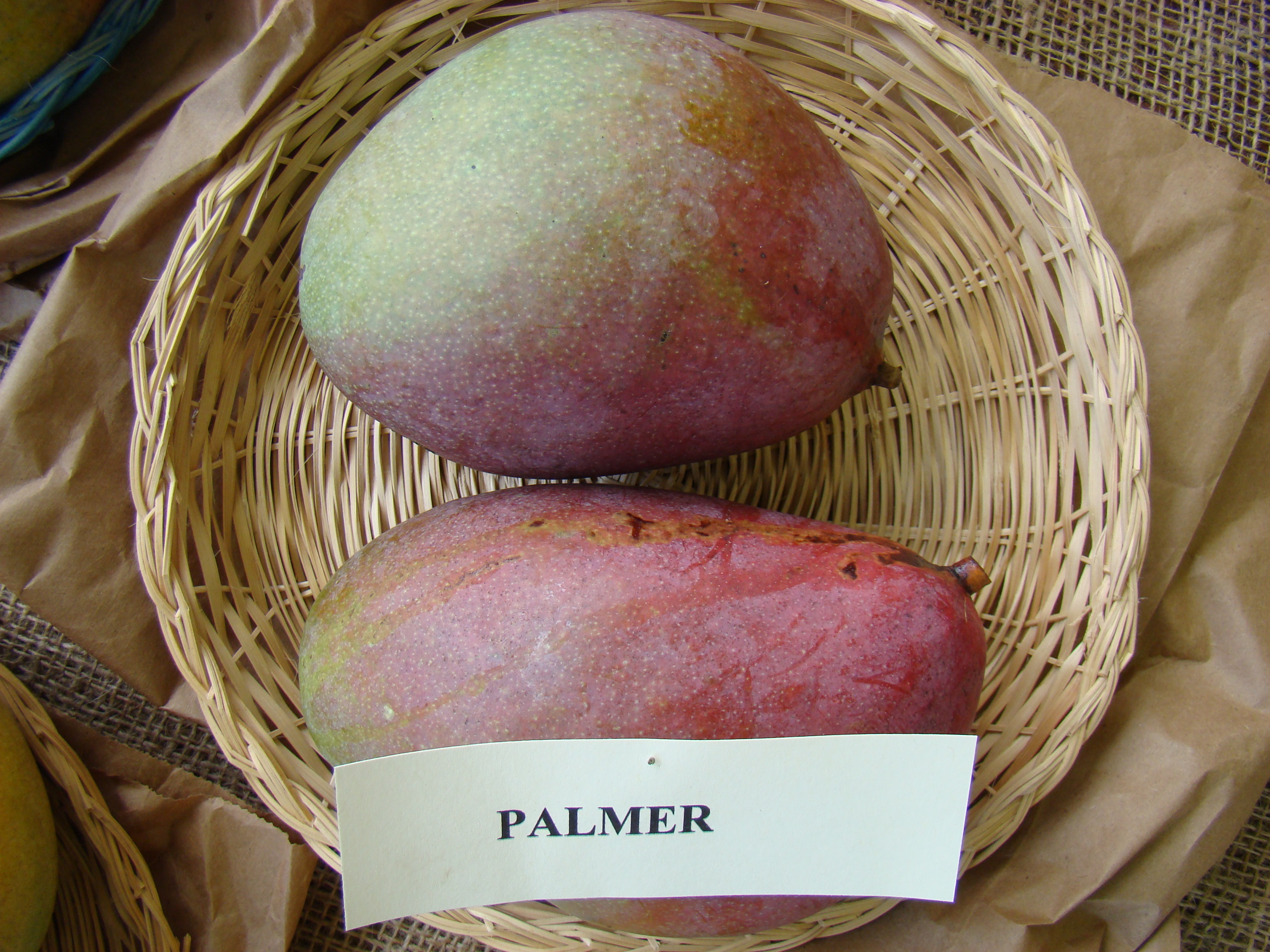
- Display of 'Palmer' fruit at the Redland Summer Fruit Festival, Fruit and Spice Park, Homestead, Florida
- Genus: Mangifera
- Hybrid parentage: 'Haden' × unknown
- Cultivar: 'Palmer'
- Origin: Florida, US

The 'Palmer' mango is a large, commercially grown late-season mango cultivar that originated in south Florida.

== History ==
The original tree was grown from a seed planted around 1925 on the property of Victor Mell of Miami, Florida. For the following decades Palmer's parentage was unknown; however, a 2005 pedigree analysis estimated Palmer was a seedling of Haden. The variety was first propagated in 1945 and officially named in 1949. It gained some commercial acceptance in Florida and is still grown on a limited commercial basis in the state today, as well as areas outside the United States such as Africa and Australia.

Palmer trees are planted in the collections of the USDA's germplasm repository in Miami, the University of Florida's Tropical Research and Education Center in Homestead, Florida, and the Miami–Dade Fruit and Spice Park, also in Homestead.

== Description ==
The fruit is large, with especially big specimens reaching several pounds in weight. Coloration tends to be yellow with red blush when ripe; the fruit will turn purple long before becoming mature, sometimes leading to immature fruits being picked. The flesh is orange-yellow and has a mild and aromatic flavor, with minimal fiber, and contains a monoembryonic seed. It ripens from July to early September in Florida, making it a late-season cultivar.

The trees are moderately vigorous growers and have upright canopies.

== See also ==
- List of mango cultivars
