= Fascell =

Edible fruit cultivar

Mango 'Fascell'
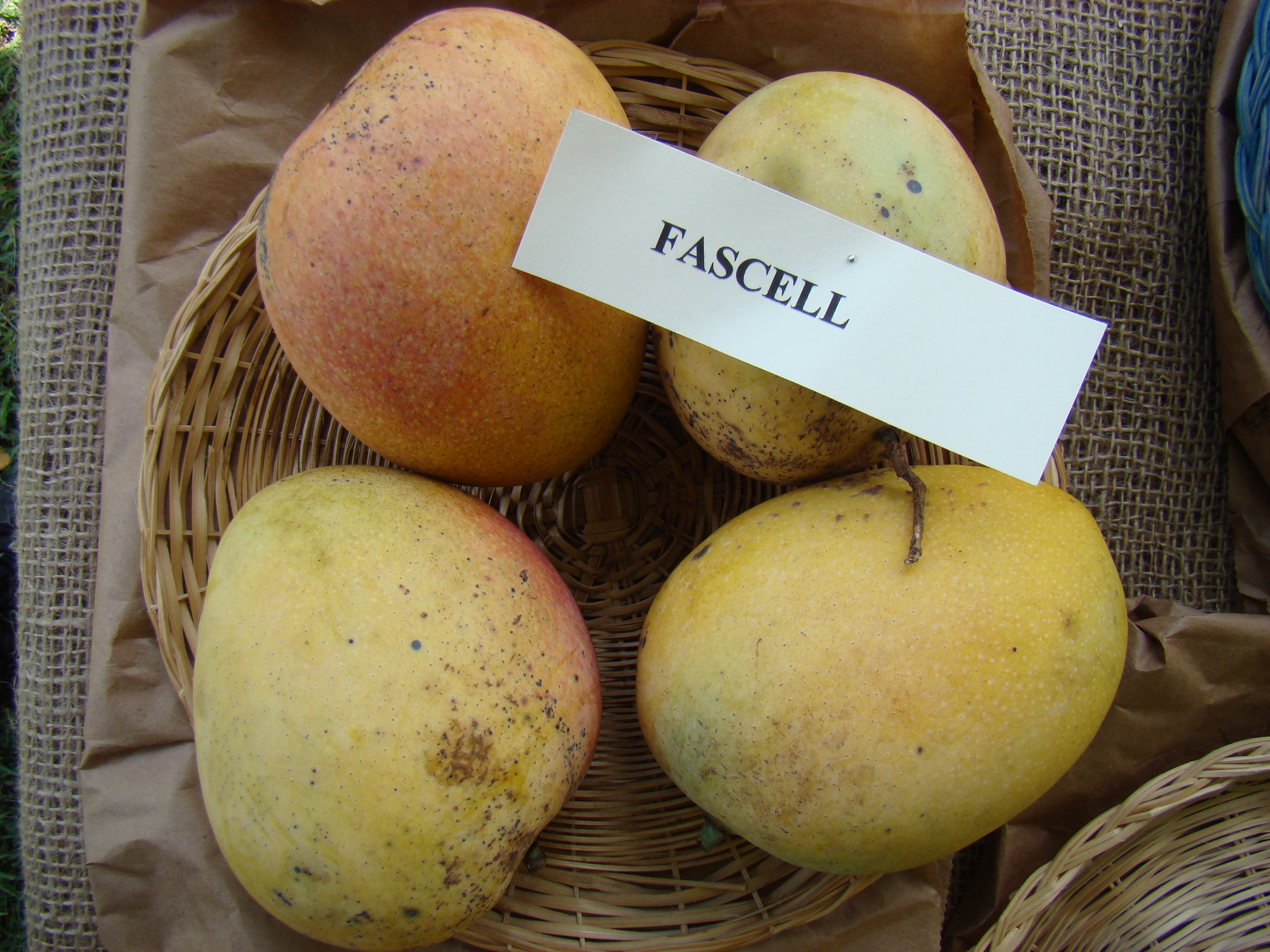
- Display of Fascell mangoes in the Redland Summer Fruit Festival, Fruit and Spice Park, Homestead, Florida
- Genus: Mango
- Hybrid parentage: 'Haden' and 'Brooks'
- Cultivar: 'Fascell'
- Breeder: Michael Fascell
- Origin: Florida, US

The 'Fascell' mango is a named commercial mango cultivar that originated in south Florida.

== History ==
The original tree was grown from a seed planted by Michael Fascell of Miami, Florida in 1929, and was likely a cross between Haden and Brooks. Fascell's intention was to create a variety to fill the gap between the harvesting seasons of Haden and Brooks. The tree first fruited in 1936. Fascell, a nurseryman and prominent member of the Florida Mango Forum, patented the fruit in 1941 (plant patent number 451), making the Fascell one of the first patented mango varieties in Florida. Beginning in 1942 the tree was sold as nursery stock on a small scale. Though it never became a popular dooryard tree, Fascell is still grown on a small commercial scale in Florida.

A Fascell tree is planted in the collection of the University of Florida's Tropical Research and Education Center in Homestead, Florida.

== Description ==
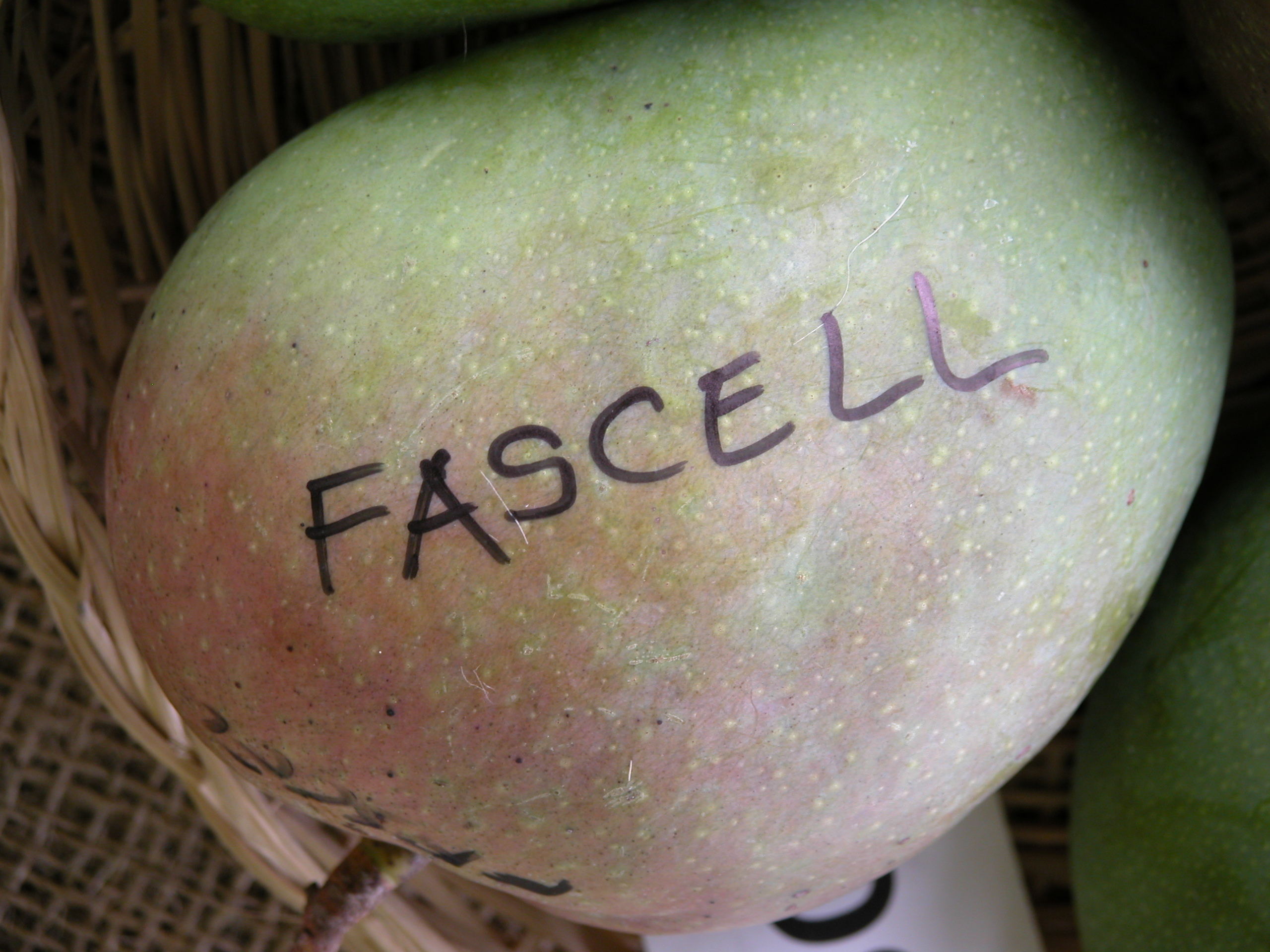
Display of 'Fascell' mangoes in the Tropical Agricultural Fiesta in the Fruit and Spice Park in Homestead, Florida

The fruit is of oval shape and has no beak, has a laterally compressed appearance, and often appears heart-shaped. It turns yellow at maturity with a distinctive bright carmine colored blush. The flesh is sweet and fiberless, containing a monoembryonic seed. It typically matures from June to July in Florida.

'Fascell' trees are vigorous growers with spreading canopies.

== See also ==
- List of mango cultivars
