= Parvin (mango) =

Mango cultivar

Mangifera 'Parvin'
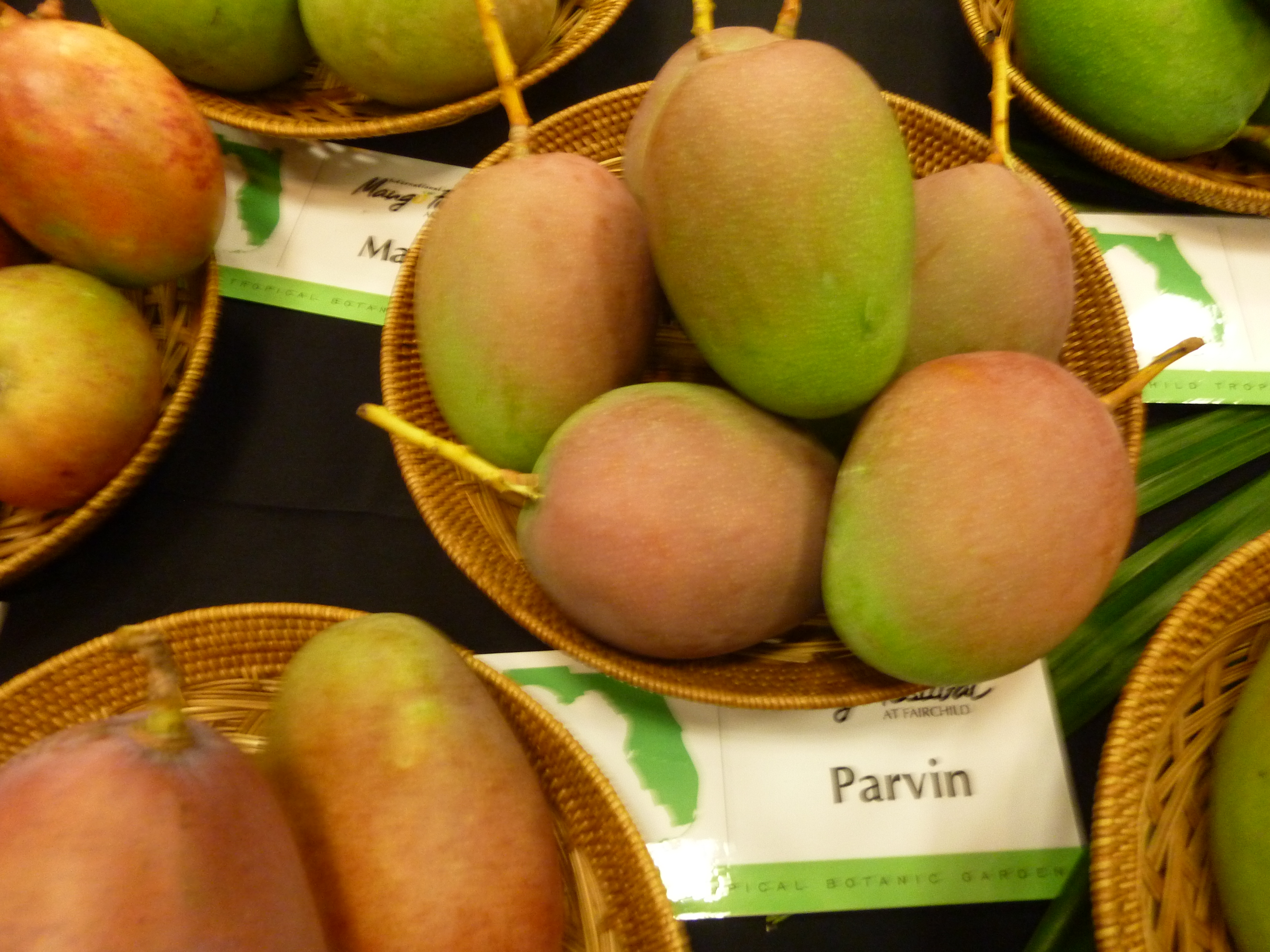
- Genus: Mangifera
- Species: Mangifera indica
- Cultivar: 'Parvin'
- Origin: Florida, US

The 'Parvin' mango is a named commercial mango cultivar that originated in Southwest Florida.

== History ==
The original tree was reportedly grown from a Haden mango seed, and was planted in 1940 on the property of Clint Fisk Parvin in Bradenton, Florida. During the 1940s Parvin was submitted for evaluation to the Variety Committee of the Florida Mango Forum, which gave it a positive recommendation. Characteristics such as color, production and handling characteristics (due to its thick skin), and flavor made Parvin a potential commercial cultivar. While Parvin only saw limited commercial plantings in Florida, it is grown on a commercial basis in Puerto Rico.

== Description ==
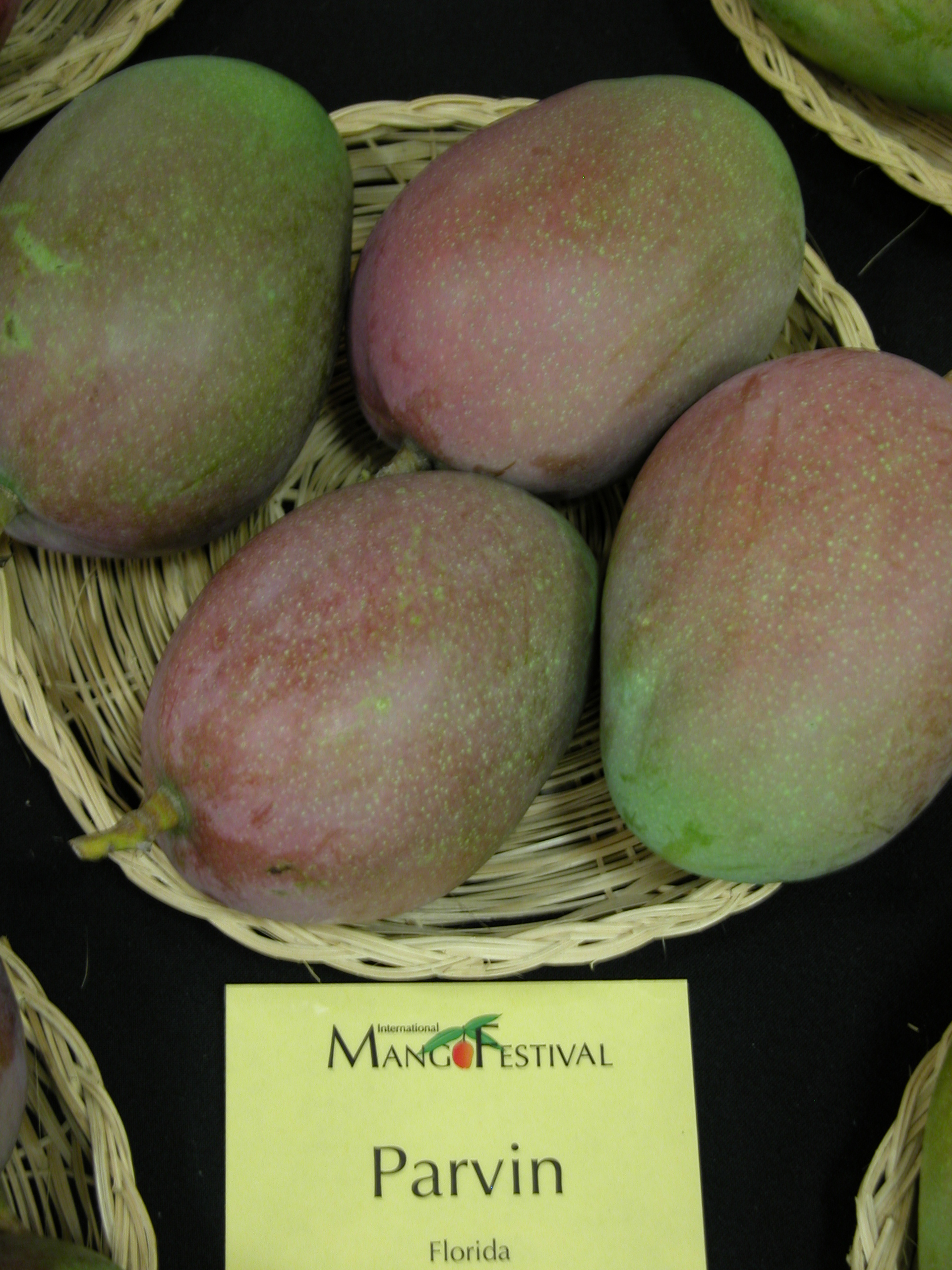
Display of 'Parvin' mango at the 15th Annual International Mango Festival at the Fairchild Tropical Botanic Garden in Coral Gables, Florida

The fruit are oval to oblong in shape and have a rounded apex, lacking a beak. The skin is thick and the color is yellow with red or crimson blush covering much of it at maturity. The fruit average a little over a pound in weight, and typically ripen from July to August in Florida. The flesh is fiberless and has a deep orange color with a sweet flavor, and contains a monoembryonic seed. Parvin is known for producing many small, seedless fruit often referred to as "nubbins".

The trees are vigorous growers that will develop rounded and spreading, dense canopies.

== See also ==
- List of mango cultivars
