= Cogshall (mango) =

Mango cultivar

Mangifera 'Cogshall'
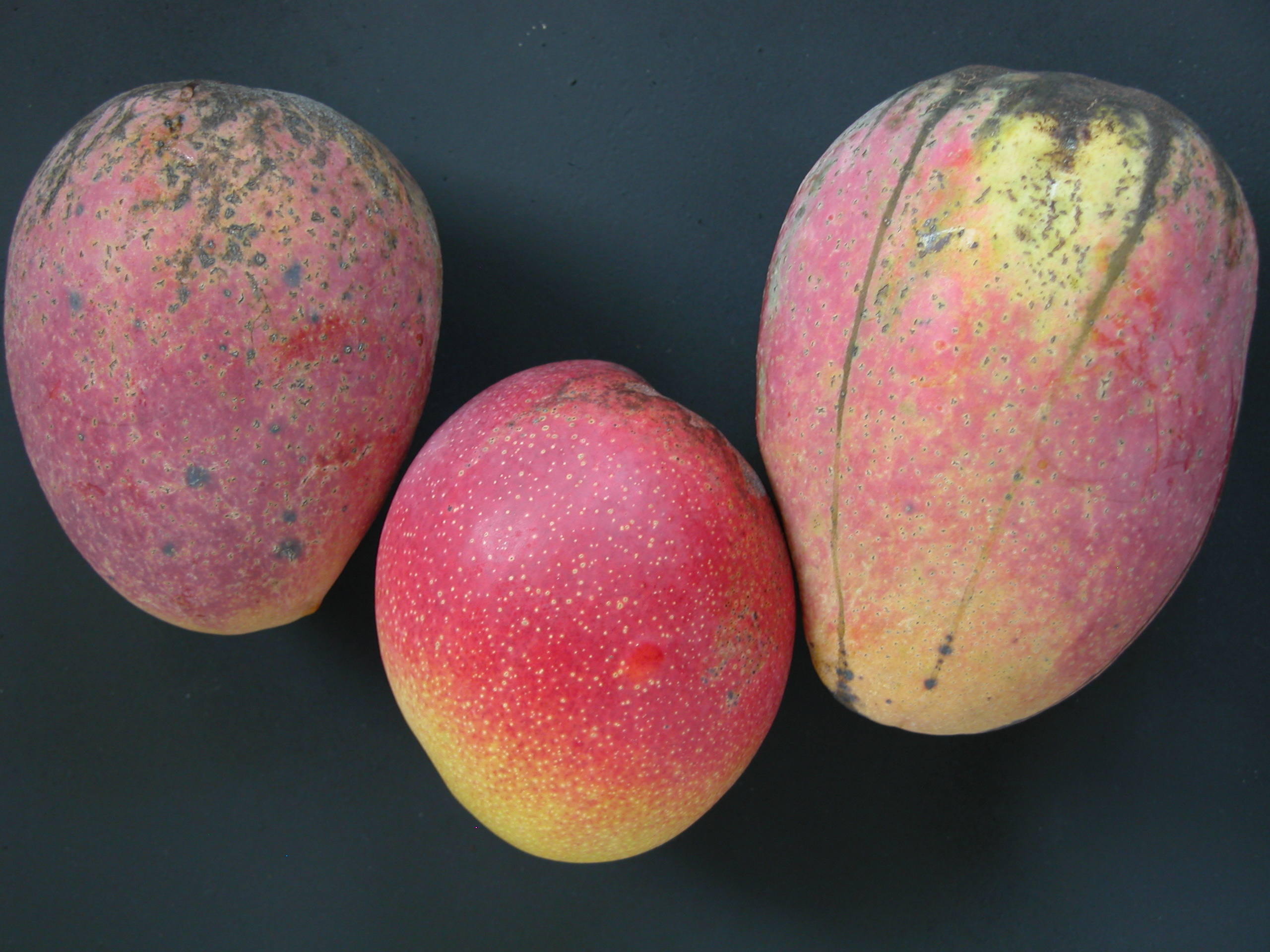
- Two 'Cogshall' mangoes pictured to the left and right with a 'Haden' mango in the middle, of which 'Cogshall' was likely a seedling
- Genus: Mangifera
- Species: Mangifera indica
- Hybrid parentage: 'Haden' seedling
- Cultivar: 'Cogshall'
- Origin: Florida, US

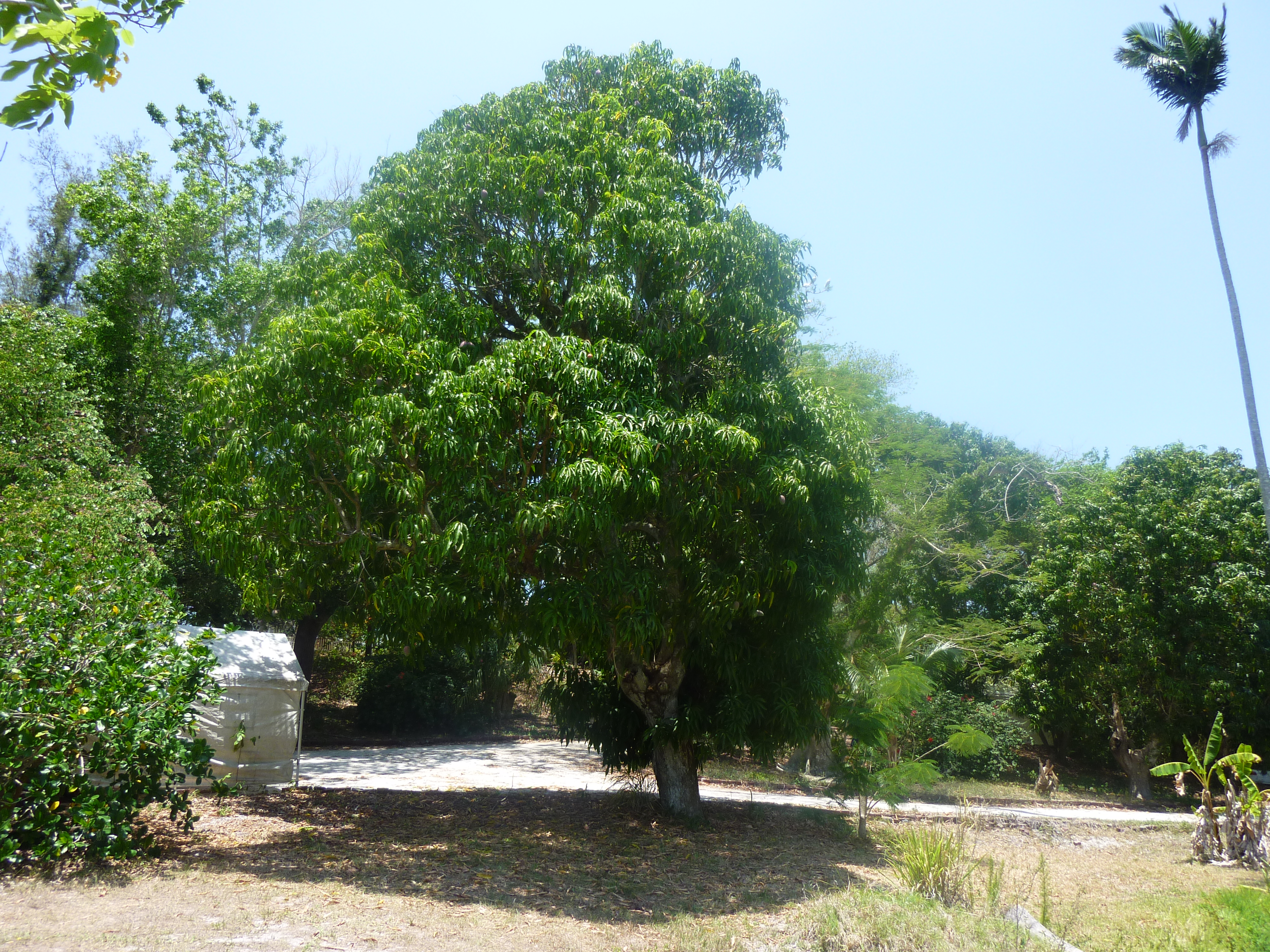
A 'Cogshall' tree growing on the former property of Frank Adams on Pine Island in Bokeelia, Florida,

The 'Cogshall' mango is a named mango cultivar that originated in southwest Florida.

== History ==
The original tree grew from a seed planted in Pine Island, Florida. For decades the parentage of Cogshall was unknown; however, a 2005 pedigree analysis estimated that Haden was the parent. The tree first fruited in the 1940s and in 1950 a specimen was planted for observation at the University of Florida's Tropical Research and Education Center (TREC) in Homestead, Florida. Afterwards, several more grafted trees were planted and in 1956 the fruit was submitted to the Florida Mango Forum. Despite having good eating characteristics, color, and disease resistance, the cultivar did not become a popular commercially adapted mango due to its soft flesh and thin skin. However, the Cogshall began receiving attention after being recommended by such horticulturalists as Richard Campbell of the Fairchild Tropical Botanic Garden. Since then it has become a more commonly carried nursery stock tree in Florida due to its small growth habit.

Cogshall trees are planted in the collections of the USDA's germplasm repository in Miami, Florida, and the Miami-Dade Fruit and Spice Park.

== Description ==
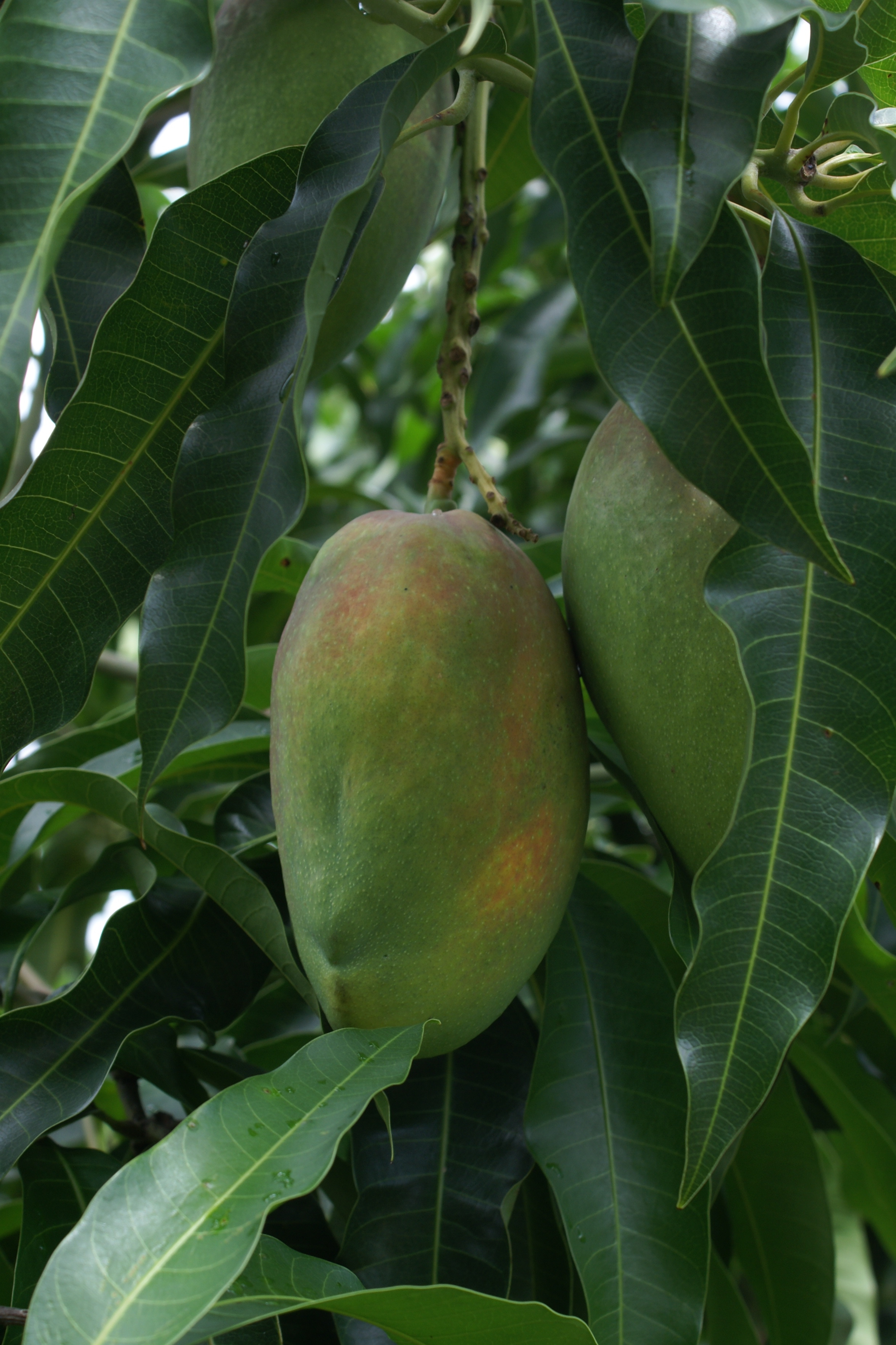
Cogshall mango in Reunion Island

The fruit is oblong and averages just under a pound in weight. At maturity it has a yellow background color with significant crimson blush covering the skin. The flesh is fiberless, soft and juicy, with a yellow color and sweet flavor, containing a monoembryonic seed. The fruit ripens from June to July in Florida.

The tree is noted for its small growth habit, due to having considerably shorter internodes compared to other mango trees. Trees can grow over 20 feet if allowed to do so, but are often kept well under 10 feet in height with regular pruning. The tree remains productive at this height and has been labeled as a "dwarf" mango by some, suitable for container growing.
