= Alice (mango) =

Mango cultivar

Mangifera 'Alice'
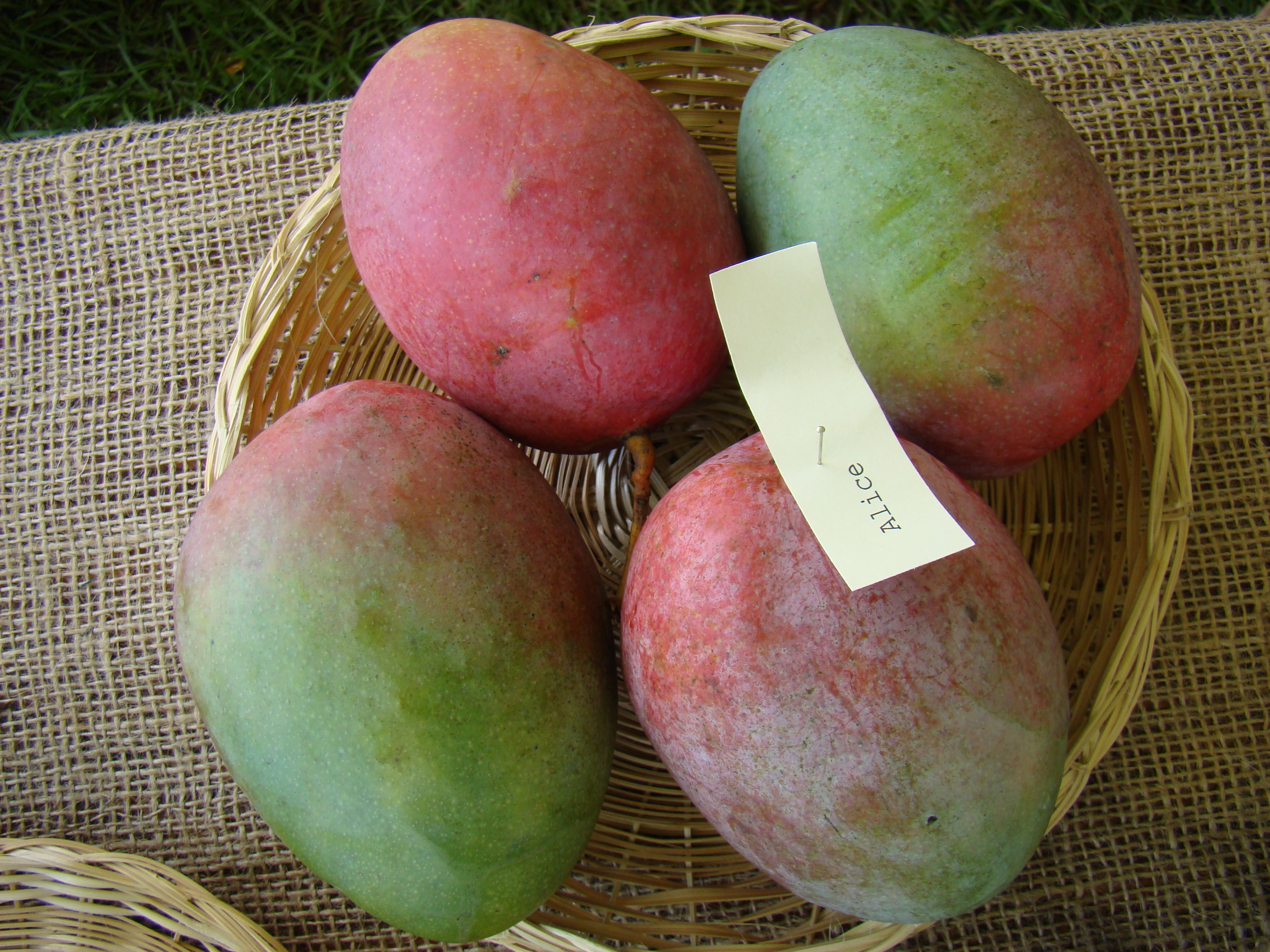
- Genus: Mangifera
- Species: Mangifera indica
- Hybrid parentage: 'Saigon' seedling
- Cultivar: 'Alice'
- Origin: Florida, US

The Alice is a mango cultivar that originated in South Florida.

== History ==
The original tree was reportedly a seedling of the 'Saigon' mango planted in 1935 on the property of Fred Herman in South Miami, Florida, and was named after his wife Alice Herman. Some have speculated that Alice may have been a hybrid between a Saigon and an Indian mango. The tree first fruited in 1940, with its name being published in 1950.

While the fruit was considered of good quality, Alice did not become commercially adapted primarily due to consistently light crops.

An Alice tree is part of the USDA's germplasm collection in Miami, Florida, and an example is also planted at the University of Florida's Tropical Research and Education Center in Homestead, Florida.

== Description ==
The fruit is of oval shape, averaging under a pound in weight at maturity. It has smooth skin that turns yellow orange at maturity with some red blush. The apex is rounded and contains no beak. The flesh has a strong aroma, and is fiberless, rich, and sweet. It contains a monoembryonic seed. In Florida the fruit usually ripens from late June to July.

The tree is a vigorous grower and has a spreading canopy.
