= Southern Blush =

Mango cultivar

Mangifera 'Southern Blush'
- Genus: Mangifera
- Species: Mangifera indica
- Cultivar: 'Southern Blush'
- Breeder: Laurence H. Zill
- Origin: Florida, US

The 'Southern Blush' mango is a named commercial mango cultivar that originated in south Florida.

== History ==
Southern Blush originated as a seedling beneath an Eldon tree on the property of Laurence Zill. It received its name for being the most southern planted mango on Zill's property and because it developed a brilliant red blush when exposed to full sun.

The cultivar has been propagated both for nursery stock as a dooryard tree as well as being planted on a limited commercial scale in Florida. It is recognized for its flavor, color, and disease resistance.

A Southern Blush tree is planted in the collection of the Miami-Dade Fruit and Spice Park in Homestead, Florida.

== Description ==
The fruit are oval in shape, averaging a little over a pound in weight at maturity. The skin is yellow in color with some red blush. The flesh is yellow and sweet, with minimal fiber and containing a monoembryonic seed. The fruit typically ripen from June to July in Florida and the trees are considered good producers with good disease resistance.

The trees are moderately vigorous growers.

== See also ==
- List of mango cultivars
