= Haden (mango) =

Mango cultivar

Mangifera 'Haden'
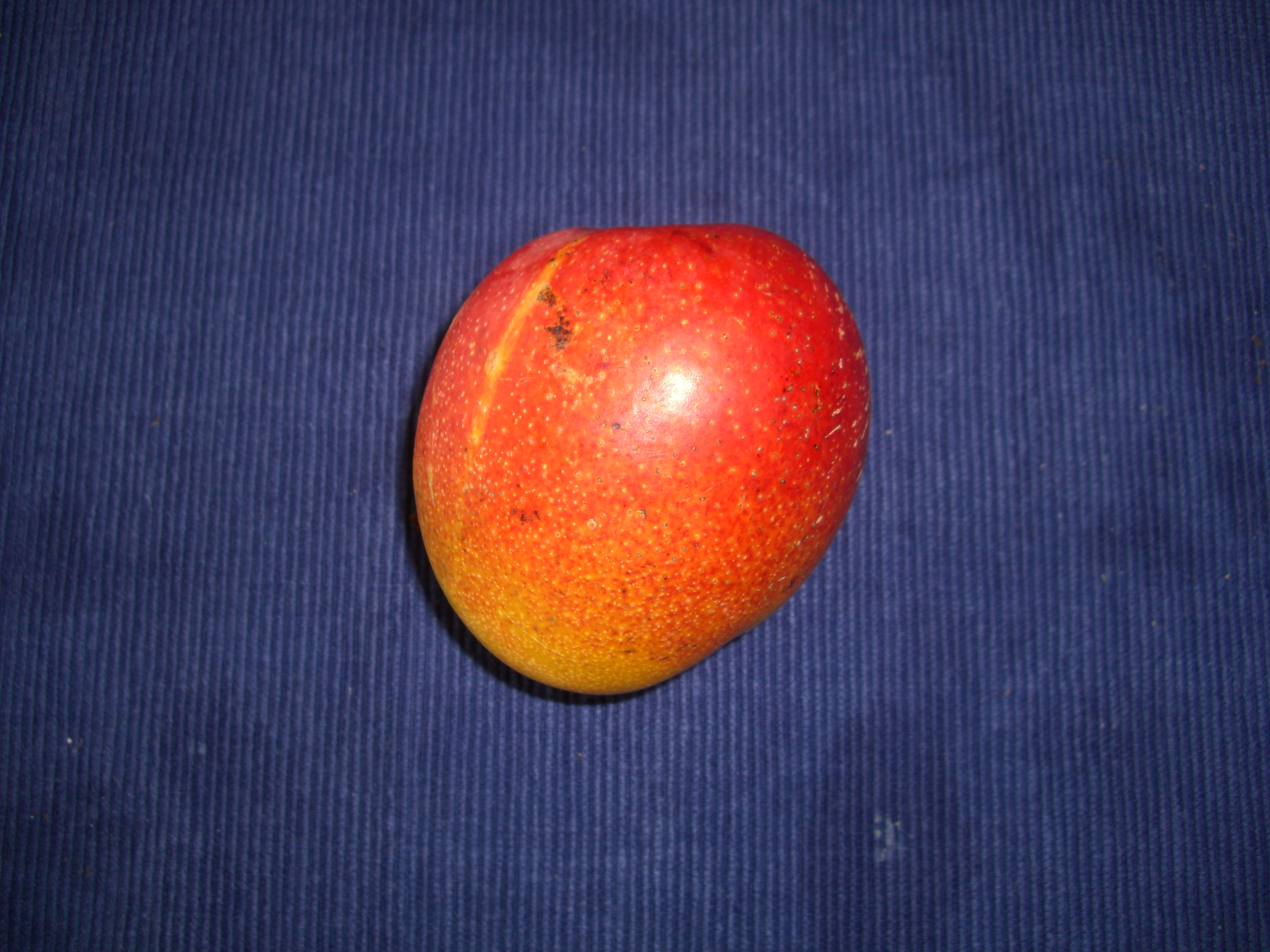
- Genus: Mangifera
- Species: Mangifera indica
- Cultivar: 'Haden'
- Origin: Grown from a Mulgoba mango seed planted in Coconut Grove, Florida in 1902.

The 'Haden' mango (or 'Hayden') is a named mango cultivar that became one of the most widely cultivated in the world after it was introduced in the early 20th century through south Florida. It would ultimately become the parent of many other mango cultivars later developed in Florida.

== History ==
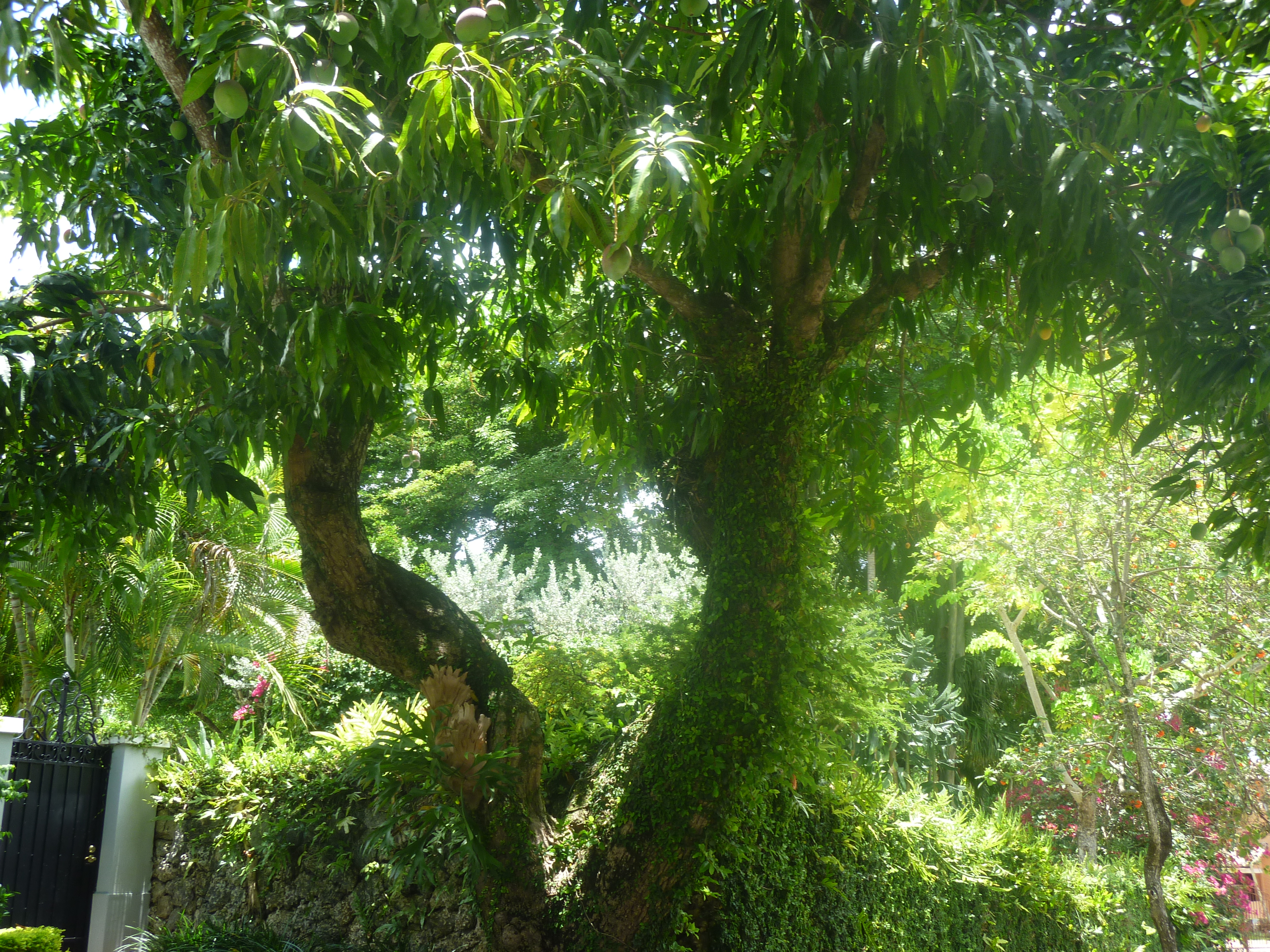
Photograph of what is believed to be the original 'Haden' tree, located in Coconut Grove, Florida

In 1902, Captain John J. Haden, a retired U.S. army officer living in Coconut Grove, Florida, planted four dozen seedlings of Mulgoba mango seeds he had purchased from Professor Elbridge Gale in Mangonia, near Lake Worth Lagoon in the area of present-day West Palm Beach. Haden would die the following year, but his wife Florence cared for the trees at their property in Coconut Grove, which first fruited in 1910. One tree in particular produced superior quality fruit, with brilliant color and good flavor. This cultivar was selected and given the family name. Both historical and pedigree analysis indicates that Haden was likely the result of a cross between Mulgova (misspelled as Mulgoba, cultivar origin in Tamil Nadu, India) and a Turpentine mango.

Florence Haden, realizing the potential of the cultivar, reported its success to the Florida State Horticultural Society, and sent two specimens of the fruit to the United States Department of Agriculture, and another larger mango to Edward Simmonds of the Plant Introduction Station at Miami. Simmonds was immediately intrigued and eventually took up propagating the Haden in south Florida. Haden became a big commercial success, largely due to its large-scale propagation by nursery-owner George Cellon, and would dominate the mango industry in the state for roughly 25 years, as well as being introduced to other locations with great success, such as Honduras, Hawaii and Australia. Haden gradually fell out of favor as a commercial mango largely due to fungus problems, along with inconsistent production, problems with internal breakdown of the fruit (also known as jelly seed), and the availability of new varieties with superior characteristics. Most of the mango varieties subsequently developed in Florida were either direct or indirect descendants of Haden.

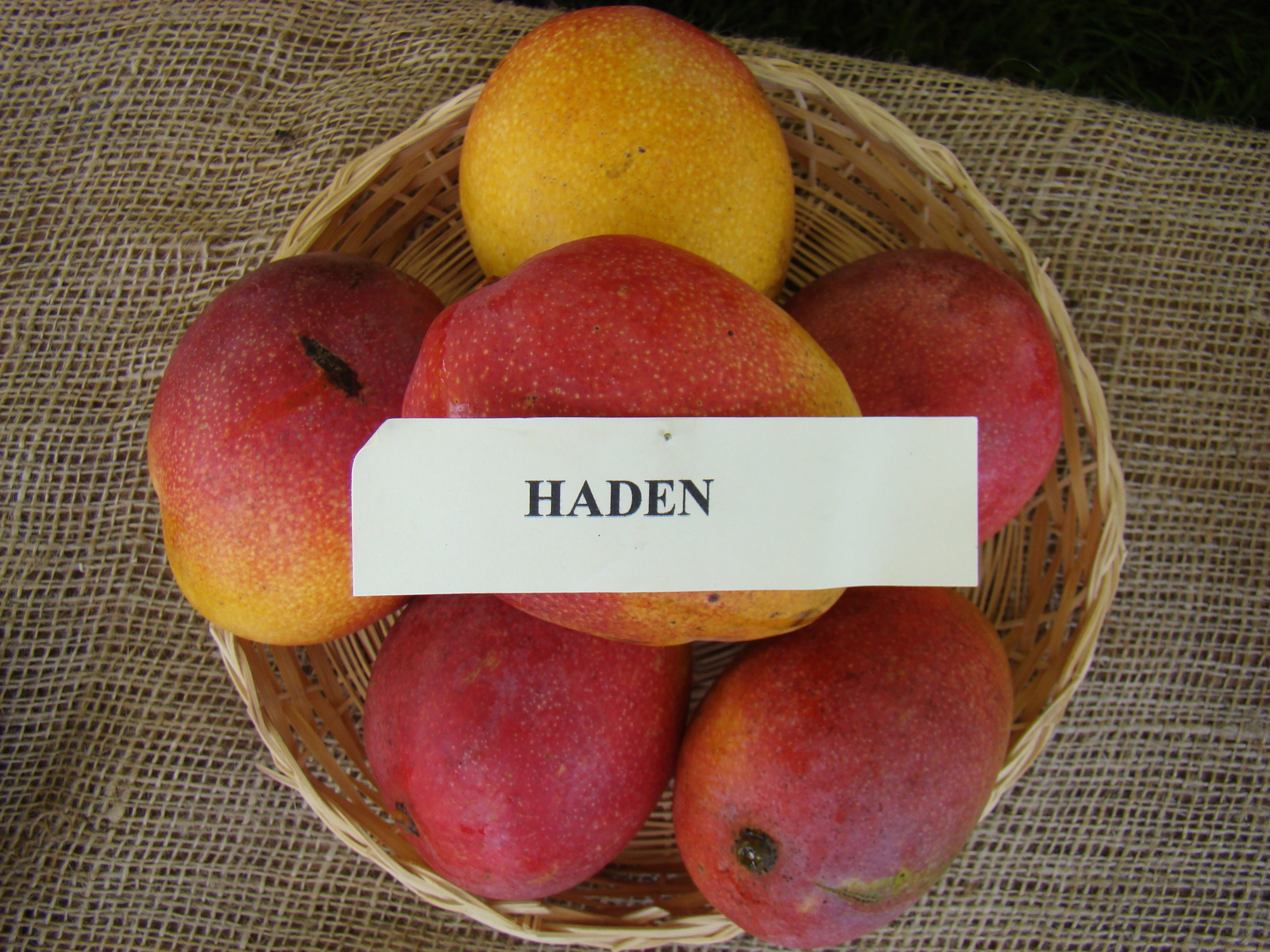
A display of mature 'Haden' fruit

Named mango varieties that are likely directly descended from Haden include:

- Allen-King/Everbearing
- Anderson (Haden × Sandersha)
- Bailey's Marvel (Haden × Bombay)
- Becky (Haden × Brooks)
- Cogshall
- Cushman (Haden × Amini)
- Earlygold
- Edward
- Fascell (Haden × Brooks)
- Glenn
- Hatcher (Haden × Brooks)
- Hodson
- Jacquelin (Haden × Bombay)
- Kent (Haden × Brooks)
- Irwin (Haden × Lippens)
- Lippens
- Osteen
- Palmer
- Parvin
- Ruby
- Sensation (Haden × Brooks)
- Southern Blush (Haden × Cushman)
- Spirit of '76 (Haden × Zill)
- Springfels
- Tommy Atkins
- Torbert
- Valencia Pride
- Van Dyke
- Winters (Haden × Ono)
- Zill (Haden × Bombay)

Despite falling out of favor as a commercial production mango, Haden remained one of the most widely propagated mangoes for nursery stock and home growing throughout the decades, and continues to be today.

Haden trees are planted in the collections of the USDA's germplasm repository in Miami, Florida, the University of Florida's Tropical Research and Education Center in Homestead, Florida, and the Miami-Dade Fruit and Spice Park, also in Homestead. The original tree still stands in Coconut Grove.

Haden – Rich in flavour and aromatic, Red colour with green and yellowish overtone, texture should be firm flesh due to fibres.
