= Torbert (mango) =

Mango cultivar

Mangifera 'Torbert'
- Genus: Mangifera
- Species: Mangifera indica
- Hybrid parentage: 'Haden' × unknown
- Cultivar: 'Torbert'
- Breeder: Tommy Torbert
- Origin: Florida, US

The 'Torbert' mango is a named mango cultivar that originated in south Florida. It is sometimes incorrectly spelled Torbet or Tolbert.

== History ==
The original tree was grown from a seed planted on the property of Tommy Torbert in Goulds, Florida during the 1940s. For decades the parentage of Torbert was unknown; however, a 2005 pedigree analysis indicated that Haden was the likely parent of Torbert.

Torbert was submitted to the Florida Mango Forum for evaluation in 1952, and the Torbert family felt the variety had potential. Graftwood was given to the University of Miami's Experimental Farm in Perrine, Florida as well as to individuals in the area, and several trees were planted in home gardens around Miami-Dade County. However, Torbert was not propagated either as nursery stock or for commercial use, and despite having received some attention and published description, it was largely forgotten.

Torbert was "reintroduced" to the United States in 1981 when graftwood was brought by Carl W. Campbell and Richard J. Campbell from a Torbert tree that had been planted in Honduras. It was later found that at least one Torbert tree was still growing at a farm in Homestead, Florida owned by Roy O. Nelson.

Torbert trees are now planted in the collections of the USDA's germplasm repository in Miami, Florida, and the Miami-Dade Fruit and Spice Park in Homestead.

== Description ==
The fruit has a round, almost spherical shape, similar to the shape of the Cushman mango. The average weight is about a pound at maturity. The skin is orange-yellow in color with red blush covering much of the skin. The skin is thick and the fruit handle well. The flesh is moderately fibrous and is yellow in color. It has a mildly sweet flavor and light aroma, and contains a polyembryonic seed, an unusual trait for a mango descended from the Haden line. The fruit typically ripen from June to July in Florida. Production is considered good and consistent.

The tree is a moderately vigorous grower, but tends to stay small to medium-sized.

== See also ==
- List of mango cultivars
