= Earlygold =

Mango cultivar

Mangifera 'Earlygold'
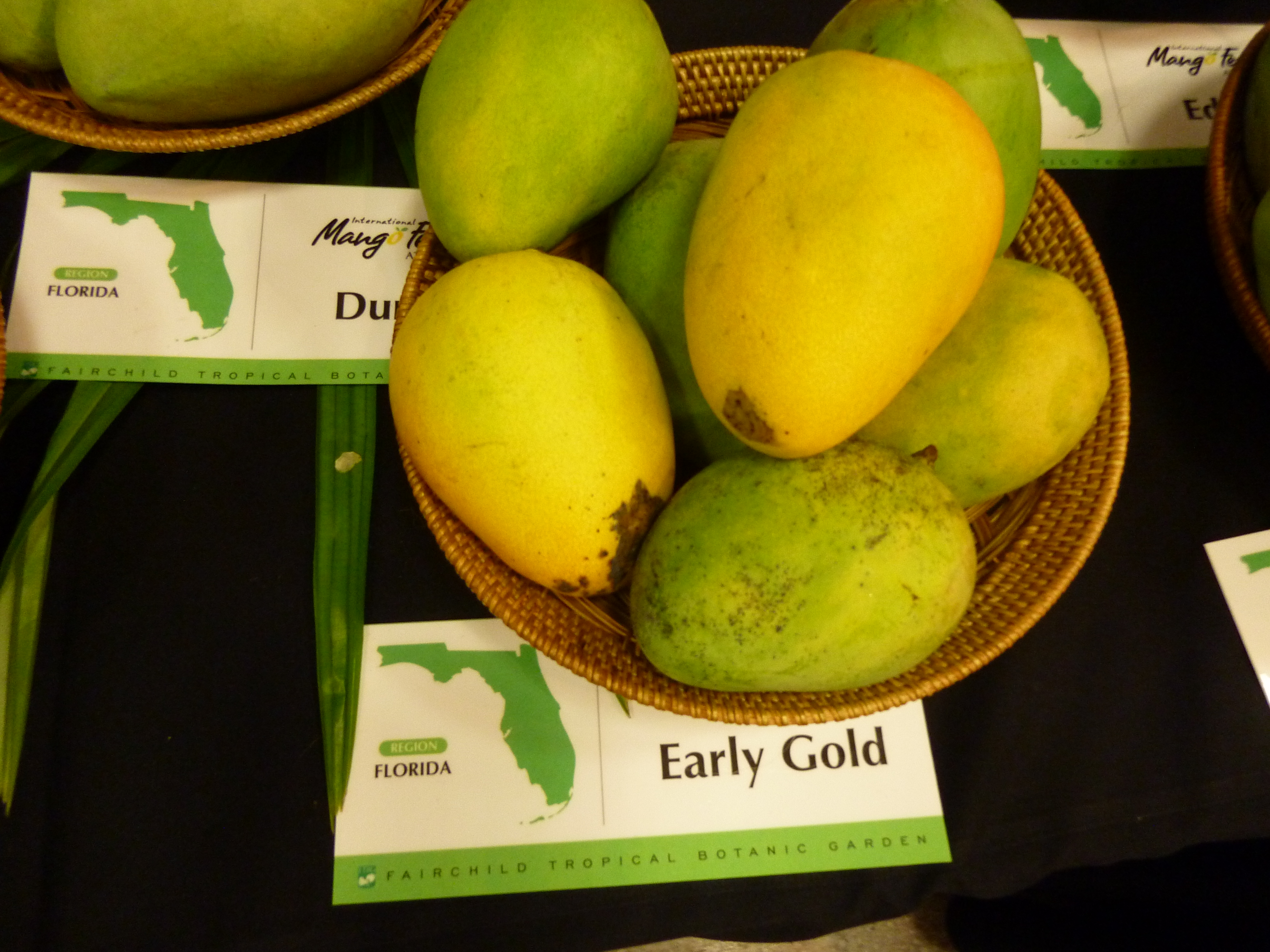
- Earlygold mangoes at the Fairchild Tropical Botanic Garden's 2010 International Mango Festival in Miami, Florida
- Genus: Mangifera
- Hybrid parentage: 'Haden' × unknown
- Cultivar: 'Earlygold'
- Breeder: Frank Adams
- Origin: Florida, US

The 'Earlygold' mango (or 'Early Gold') is an early-season mango cultivar that originated in Pine Island, Florida.

== History ==
The original tree was grown on the grove of Frank Adams in Pine Island, Florida. For decades, the parentage of the tree was unknown but a pedigree analysis indicated that Haden was the likely parent. Scions were sent to the Sub-Tropical Research Station near Miami, Florida, and a grafted tree was planted there in 1942. A distinctive characteristic of the tree is its early fruiting season, which begins in May.

== Description ==
The fruit is oblong, averaging less than a pound in weight and having a small lateral beak. The flesh is dark yellow and fiberless, and is sweet and aromatic. Ripens from May to June.

The tree is a moderately vigorous grower.
