= Turpentine (mango) =

Mango cultivar

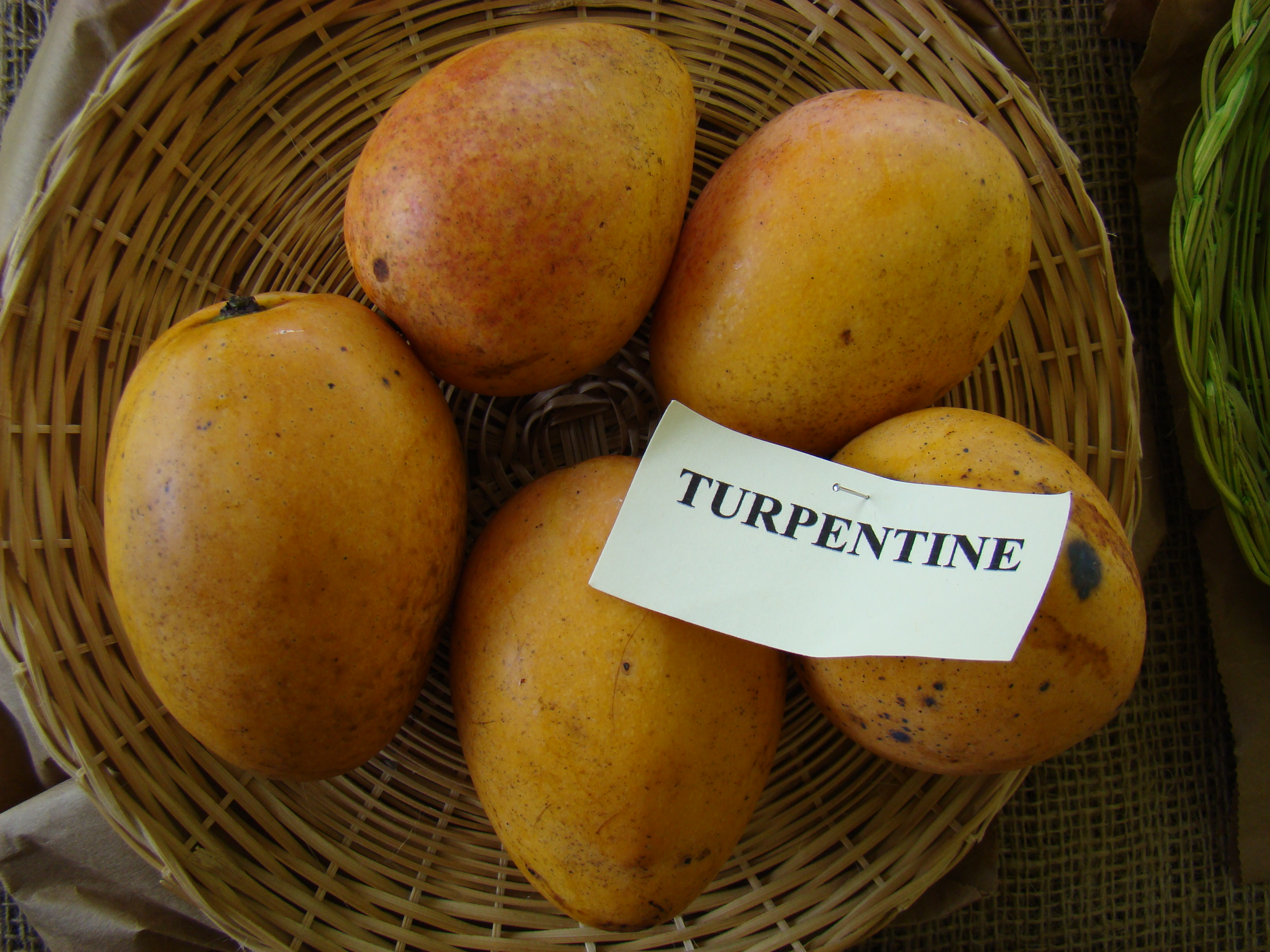
Turpentine mangoes

The Turpentine mango is a genotype of mango (Mangifera indica) cultivars traditionally grown in the Caribbean, parts of Central and South America, and South Florida. Known for their fibrous flesh and strong resinous flavor, turpentine mangoes are primarily used in local consumption, juice production, preserves, or as rootstock due to their disease resistance and vigorous growth.

This cultivar has significant salt tolerance as part of its origin in the Caribbean region, indicating growing conditions where its rootstock may be preferred over other mango cultivars.

The Turpentine mango is a source of the polyembryonic germplasm responsible for about 20% of the genetic makeup of Florida mango cultivars, which were dispersed worldwide for their commercial value in the late 20th century when it was among four mango cultivars being developed in Florida.

== Description ==
Turpentine mangoes are typically small to medium-sized fruits with thin skin and a high-fiber, juicy pulp. The odor and flavor are distinctive, having a "turpentine" quality, and may be described as resinous or piney, which is the origin of the "turpentine" name. Despite the name, the fruit is edible and safe for consumption, and the flavor is appreciated in some local traditions.

== Cultivation ==
Around 1868, seeds of the Turpentine mango were planted near Coconut Grove in south Florida, and the resultant trees prospered into the early 1900s.

These mangoes are well-adapted to tropical and subtropical climates, and are commonly found in home gardens throughout Florida, the Caribbean and parts of Central America. In Florida, the Turpentine mango is often used as a rootstock for grafting commercial mango varieties due to its strong salt tolerance, disease resistance, and ability to thrive in poor soil conditions.

== Uses ==
While the fibrous texture of turpentine mangoes makes them less desirable for fresh market sale, they are popular for making juice, chutneys, jams, and other processed mango products. Their strong aromatic profile is also valued in certain regional cuisines.

=== As rootstock ===
One of the most significant uses of the turpentine mango is as a rootstock in commercial and hobbyist mango cultivation. Its vigorous growth habit and resistance to common diseases such as anthracnose and powdery mildew make it a preferred choice for supporting grafted cultivars.
