= Totapuri =

Mango cultivar

Mangifera 'Totapuri or Kalmi'
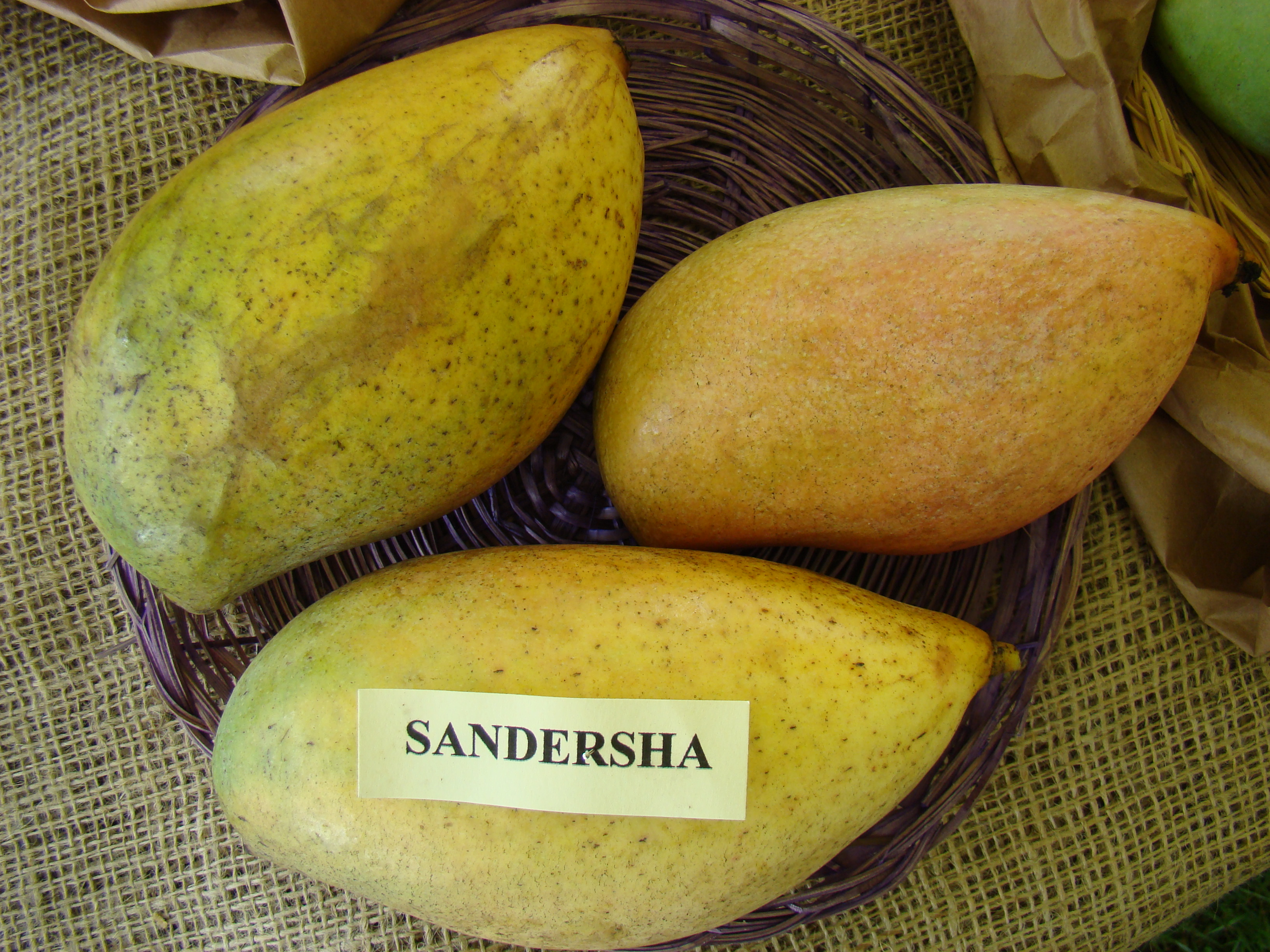
- Genus: Mangifera
- Species: Mangifera indica
- Cultivar: 'Totapuri'
- Origin: India

The Totapuri mango, or Ginimoothi, is a cultivar that is widely grown in south India and is partially cultivated in Sri Lanka. It also goes by the names Bangalore, Collector, Kallamai, Kili Mooku, Gilli, Mukku, "Ottu", and Sandersha. In Bengaluru it is referred to as Ginimoothi Maavina Kayi, while most of the rest of India calls it Totapuri or Bangalora. It literally translates to parrot face (gini = parrot, muthi = beak). Totapuri mango skin lacks the usual bitter taste of most mango skins or has a very slight bitterness and is consumed with the flesh traditionally.

== History ==
Totapuri was imported to Florida in 1901 as Sandersha and in the 1960s as Totapuri. It is the parent of at least two Florida mango cultivars, Anderson and Brooks.

== Description ==
Totapuri is one of the main cultivars grown in India along with Alphonso, Dasheri, and Kesar mango. The tree is medium size with greenish yellow fruits.
