= Tommy Atkins (mango) =

Mango cultivar

Mangifera 'Tommy Atkins'
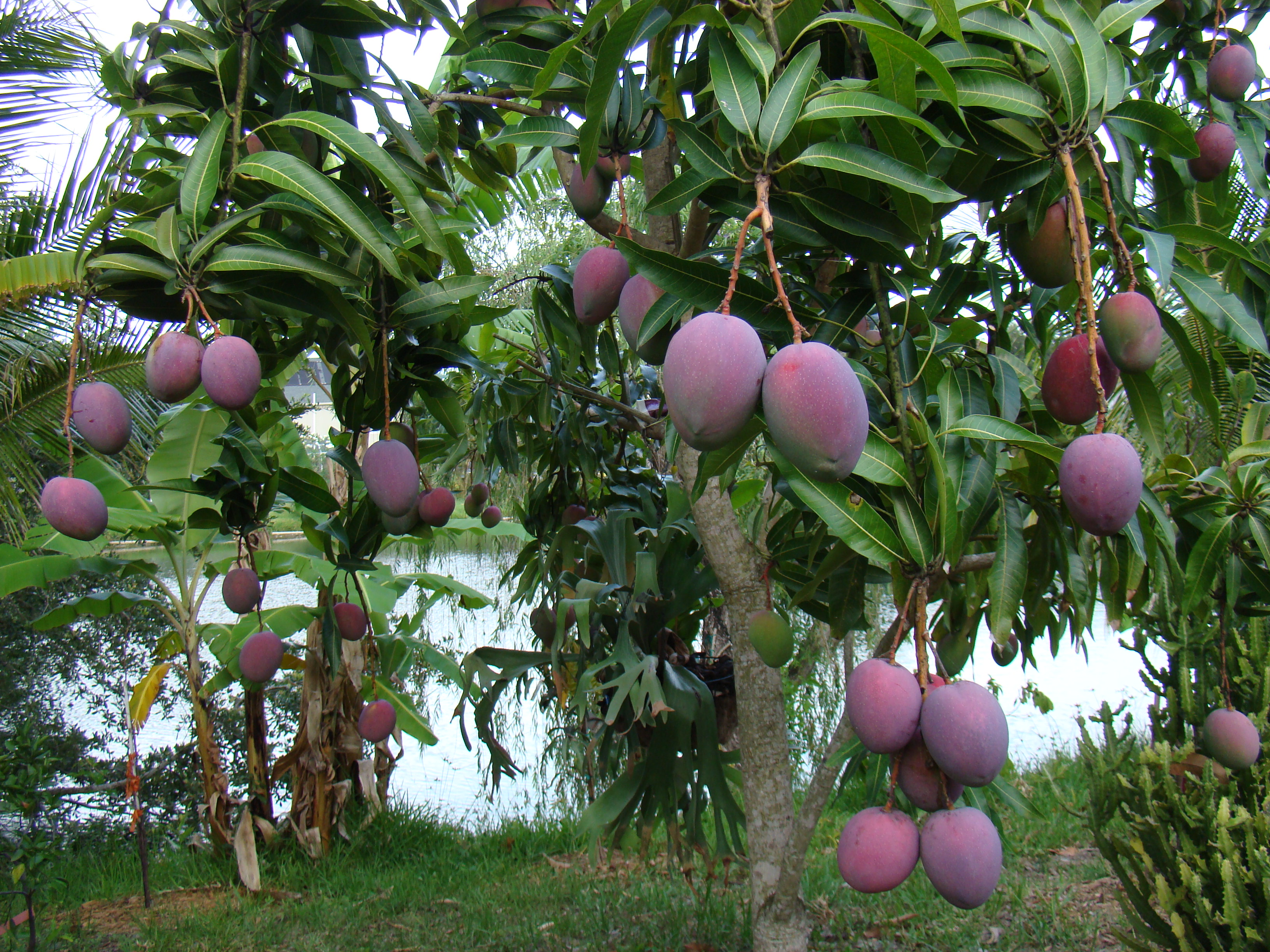
- Genus: Mangifera
- Species: Mangifera indica
- Hybrid parentage: 'Haden' × unknown
- Cultivar: 'Tommy Atkins'
- Breeder: Thomas H. Atkins of Broward County, Florida
- Origin: Florida, US

The 'Tommy Atkins' mango is a named mango cultivar. Although generally not considered to be the best in terms of sweetness and flavor, it is valued for its very long shelf life and tolerance of handling and transportation with little or no bruising or degradation.

This means it is the main mango sold in regions where mangoes have to be imported, comprising about 80% of mangoes sold in the United Kingdom and United States, apart from growing regions in California, Hawaii, Florida and Puerto Rico. However, in France it is sold at a discount, while the main imported cultivar is Kent.

== History ==
The original tree reportedly grew from a Haden seed planted around 1922 on the property of Thomas H. Atkins of Broward County, Florida. Later pedigree analysis supported the Haden parentage. Thomas Atkins submitted the fruit to the variety committee of the Florida Mango Forum multiple times during the 1950s, which rejected it due to its unremarkable eating qualities and considerable fiber in the flesh. Atkins, however, felt strongly that the fruit had good commercial potential due to its color, strong and steady production, relatively good fungus resistance, and good handling characteristics. He was able to market the fruit successfully to commercial growers, who began planting the cultivar during the 1950s. Thereafter, 'Tommy Atkins' became extremely popular as a commercial variety, eventually becoming the most commonly planted commercial mango in Florida, and later the most extensively planted in the Americas, a position it still holds today.

== See also ==
- List of mango cultivars
