= Monoembryony =

Monoembryony is the emergence of one and only one seedling from a seed. A seed giving two or more seedlings is polyembryonic. Some of the nuclear cells surrounding the embryo sac start dividing and protrude into the embryo sac and develop into embryos.
