= Fruit & Spice Park =

Park in Redland, Florida, US

Coordinates: 25.5356°N 80.4942°W

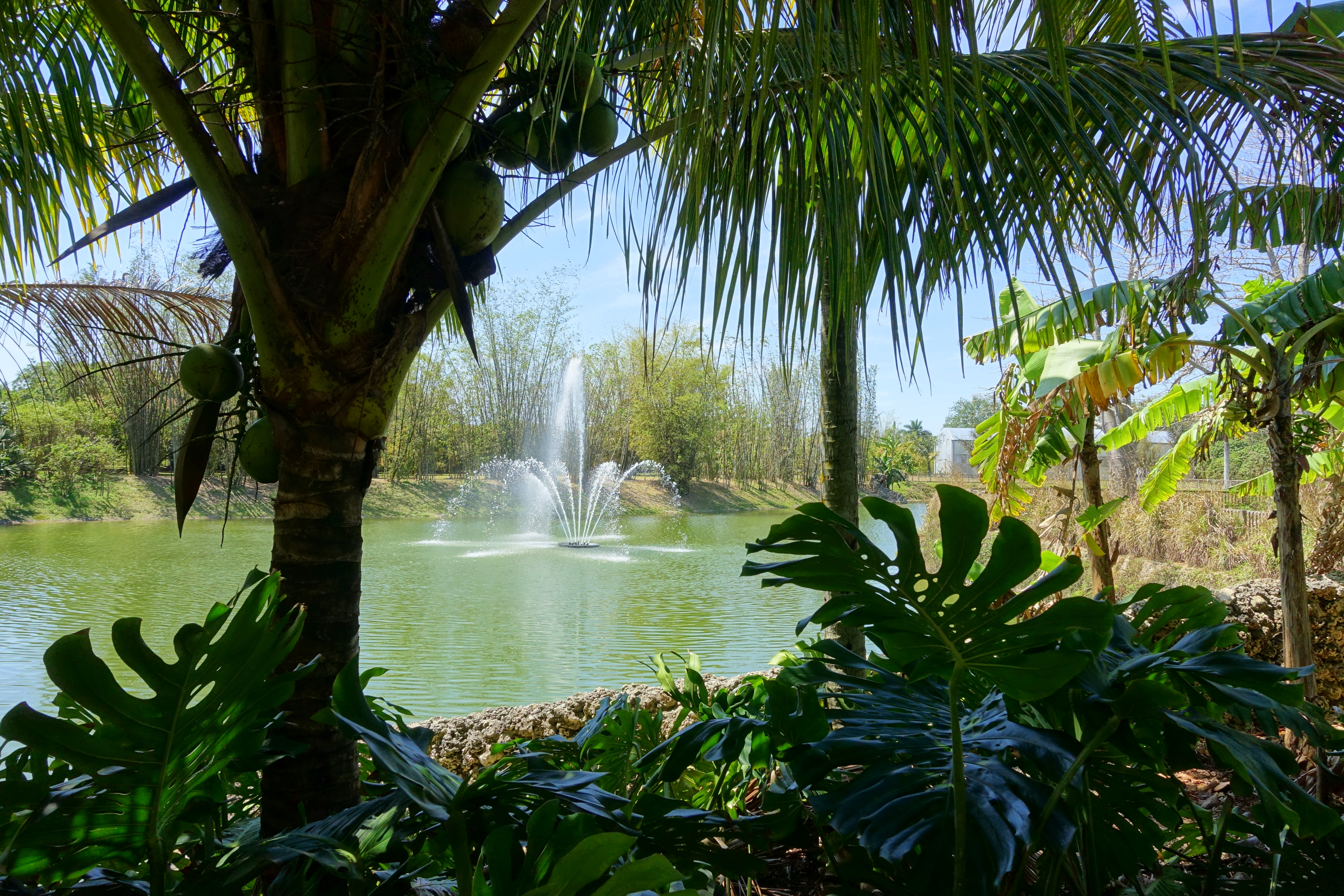
- Central pond in Fruit & Spice Park
- Interactive map of Fruit & Spice Park
- Type: Municipal
- Location: Redland, Miami-Dade County, Florida, United States
- Area: 37 acres (15 ha)
- Created: 1945
- Operator: Miami-Dade County Parks and Recreation Department
- Website: Official website

The Fruit & Spice Park, formally known as the Preston B. Bird/Mary Heinlein Fruit & Spice Park, is a 37-acre park located in Redland, Florida, and it is the only botanical garden of its kind in the United States. This park is operated by Miami-Dade County Parks and Open Spaces Department. The park attracts more than 50,000 visitors per year because of its unique agricultural environment. The garden features more than 500 different types of international exotic fruits, vegetables, herbs, and spices. Visitors are allowed to sample fallen fruits, have lunch at the Mango Cafe, or schedule a tour of the park.

== History ==
The Redland area, part of southern Miami-Dade County, has been known for its many farms, unique ability to grow fresh fruit, and its reddish soil. Mary Calkins Heinlein was the daughter of pioneer sub-tropical farmers, and she had a passion for fruits and gardens in South Florida. She had a goal to showcase the Redland and its rich agricultural environment. In 1935, she got in contact with county commissioners and parks directors to begin multiple transactions to purchase 18 acres in the Redland. County commissioner Preston B. Bird finalized the deal in 1943 and received ownership for the land with Heinlein. South Dade County's Park Development Department signed a contract with William Lyman Philips to develop the vision that Heinlein had for the garden. In 1944, construction began, and Heinlein was named superintendent. The garden featured many different fruits and agricultural developments that Heinlein had wanted. It also showcased two historical structures: the original Redland Schoolhouse and a coral rock building.

After the creation of the garden, named the Redland Fruit and Spice Park, Heinlein's 10-year term ended in 1959 when she retired as superintendent. She continued to stay an active garden club member and developed insights on the different fruits that should be planted until she died in 1979. In memory of her and Preston B. Bird, the county renamed the Redland Fruit and Spice Park to the Preston B. Bird/Mary Heinlein Fruit & Spice Park in 1980.

== Exhibits ==
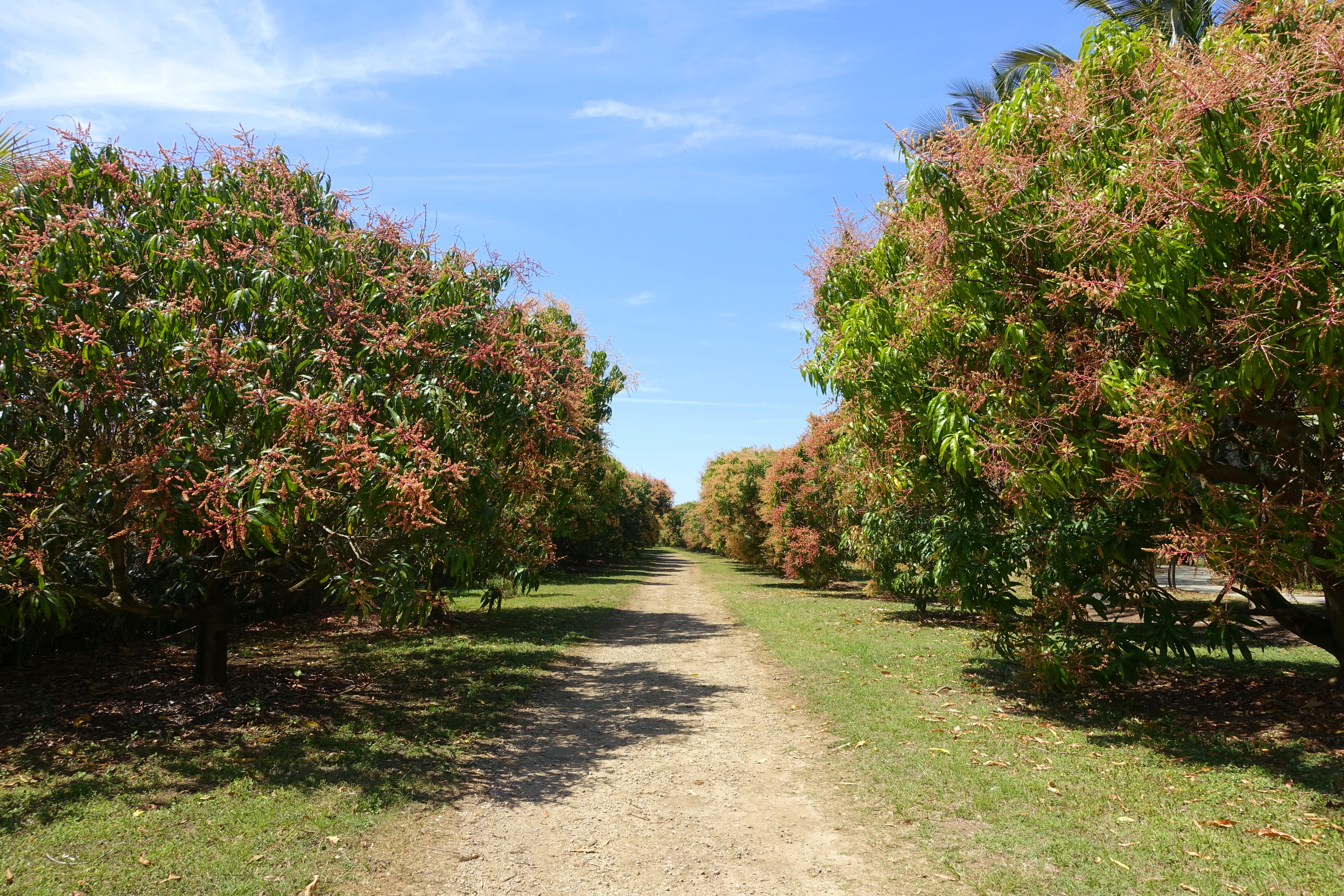
"Mango Row" along southern border of park

The park contains more than 500 varieties of fruits, nuts, and spice trees. It also includes more than 80 banana trees, 160 varieties of mango trees, more than 40 varieties of grapevines, and 70 varieties of bamboo trees. It also features guava, jackfruit, canistel, sapodilla, longan, lychee, mamey and black sapote, miracle fruit, jaboticaba, and coffee beans.

Visitors are allowed to sample these fruits once they have fallen on the ground, but they are not allowed to pick them from the trees. The park also features guided tours around the park. The tours are available every day at 11 a.m., 1:30 p.m., and 3 p.m. Private tours are available for school or club field trips.

== Facilities ==
Entrance requires an admission fee of $15 per adult and $6 per child, but the entrance has a store open to the public where many fruits from the park can be sampled for free. A yearly pass is also available for $50. A tram is available with a guide for free once inside the park. It leaves from nearby the spice garden. The park includes a cafe. The entrance hall has a large library of gardening books, spices, honey, jams, jellies, and souvenirs for sale.

== See also ==
- List of botanical gardens in the United States
