= Yadavindra Gardens =

Garden in Pinjore, Haryana, India

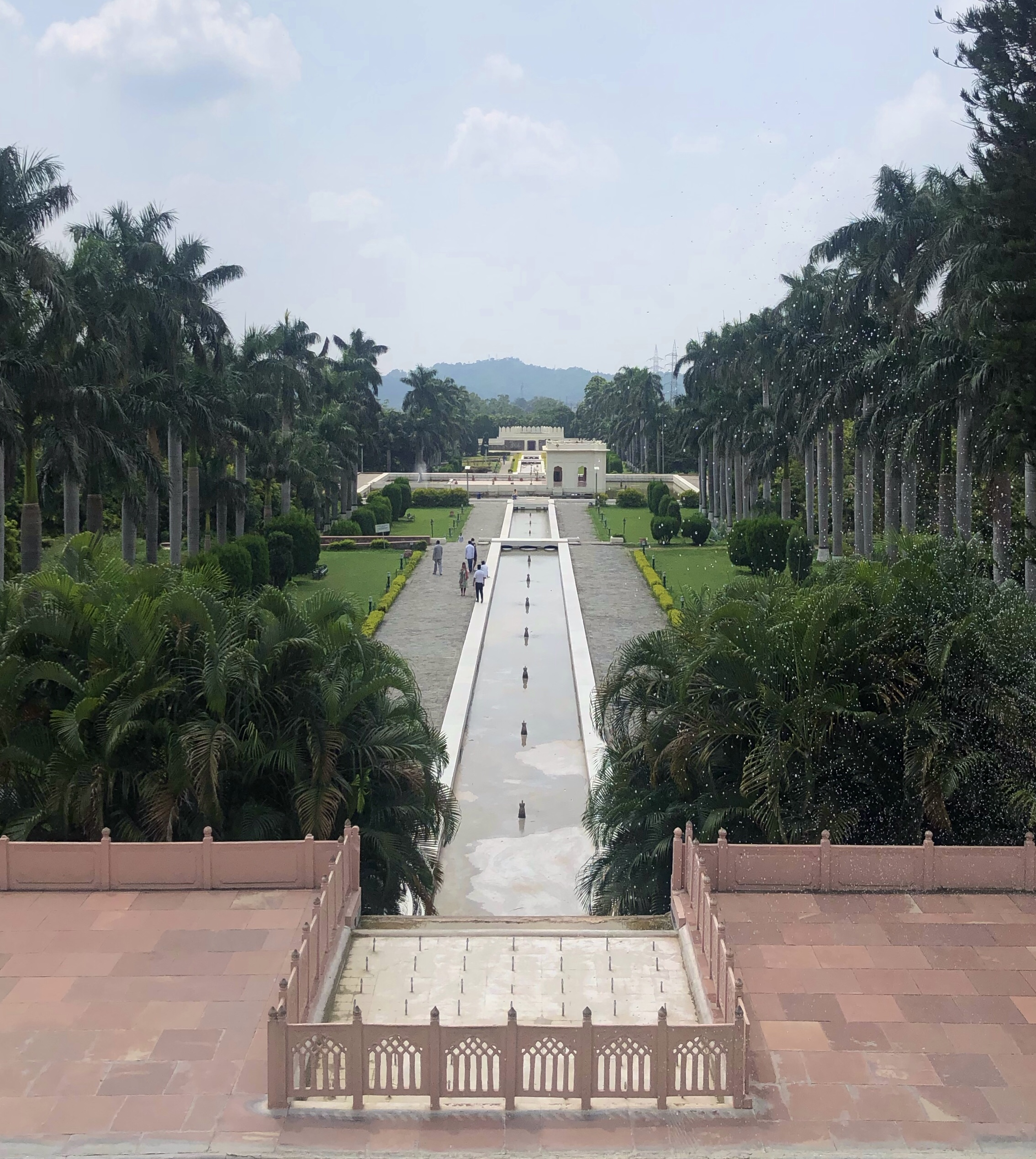
- View of the garden from Rang Mahal
- Interactive map of Yadavindra Gardens
- Type: Mughal garden
- Location: Pinjore, Haryana, India
- Coordinates: 30°47′35.9″N 76°54′47.85″E
- Area: 40.46 hectares (100.0 acres)
- Founder: Fidai Khan Koka
- Owner: Haryana Tourism Department
- Operator: Haryana Tourism Department
- Website: panchkula.nic.in

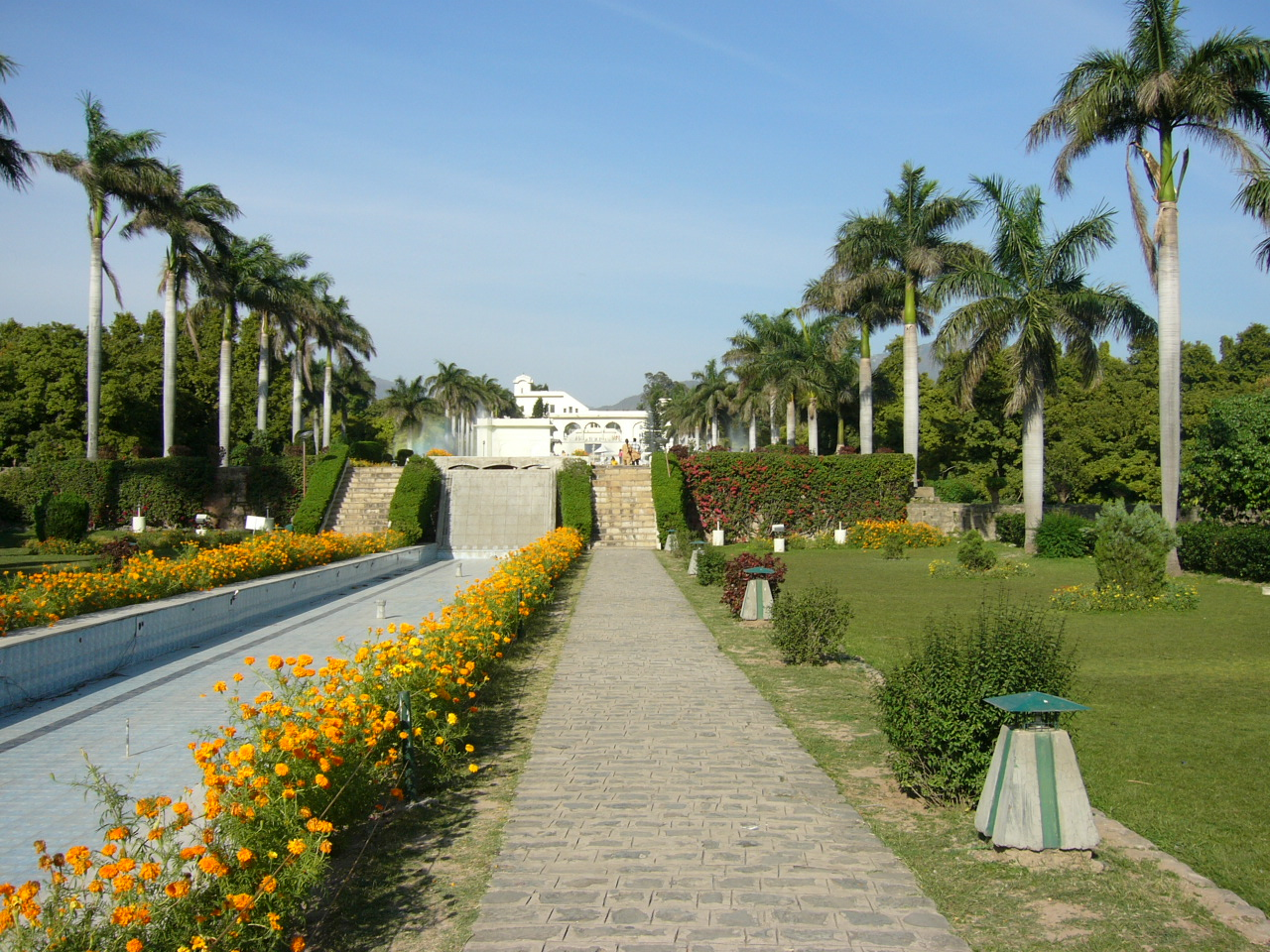
Pinjore Gardens

Yadavindra Gardens, also known as Pinjore Gardens, is a historic 17th century garden located in Pinjore city of Panchkula district in the Indian state of Haryana. Panchkula city is nearby it. It is an example of the Mughal gardens architectural style, which was renovated by the Patiala dynasty Sikh rulers. The garden was built by Fidai Khan, a foster-brother to the Mughal Emperor Aurangzeb.

== Location ==
The garden in the city of Pinjore near the Chandigarh-Shimla Expressway, near the ancient 8th century open-air archaeological museum site of Bhima Devi Temple Complex, is 22 kilometres (14 mi) from Chandigarh, 87 kilometres (54 mi) from Shimla and 5 kilometres (3.1 mi) from UNESCO World Heritage Kalka–Shimla Railway and 255 kilometres (158 mi) from Delhi. It is approachable by road, rail and air from all parts of the country.

== History ==
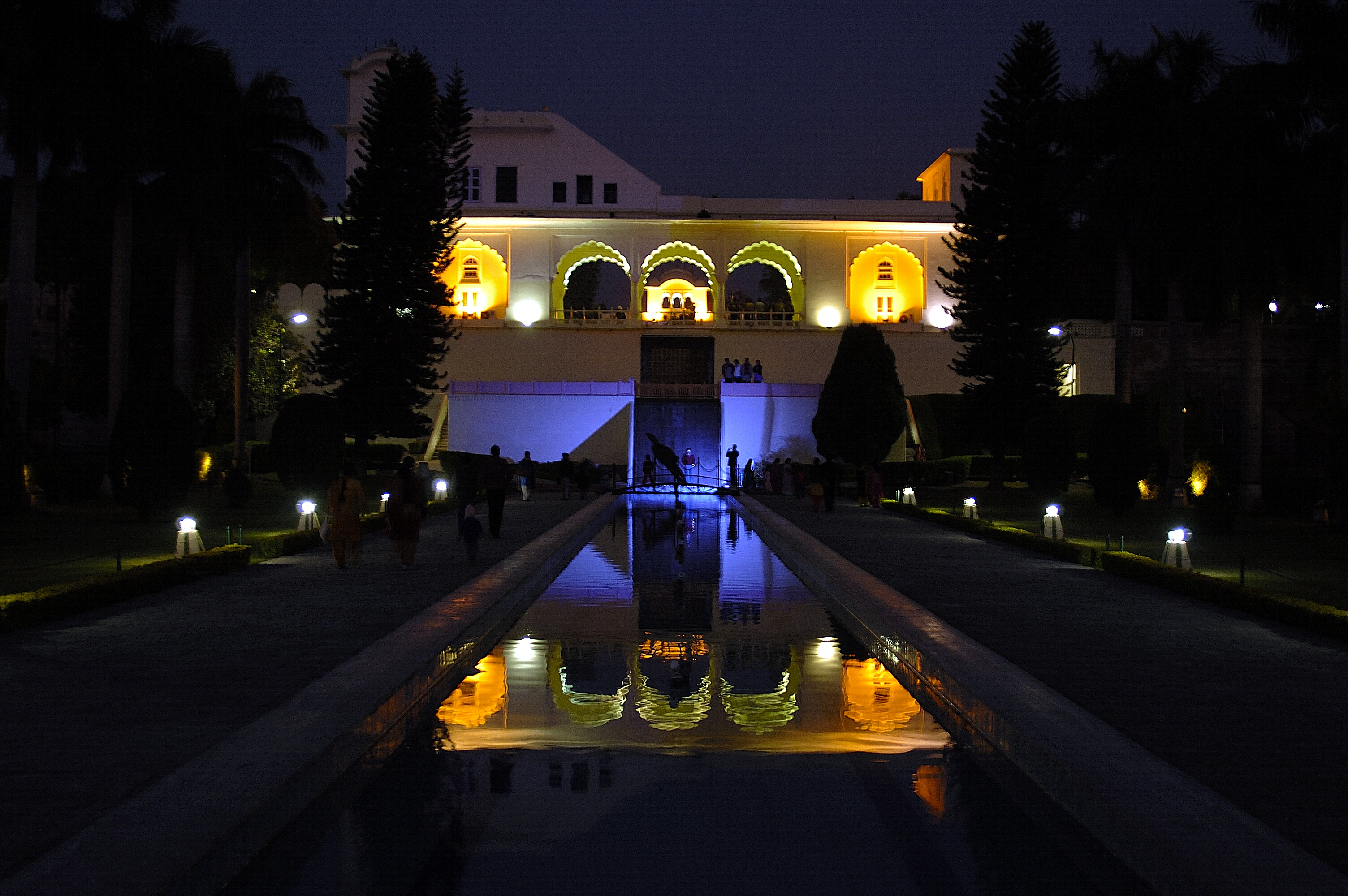
The gardens at night

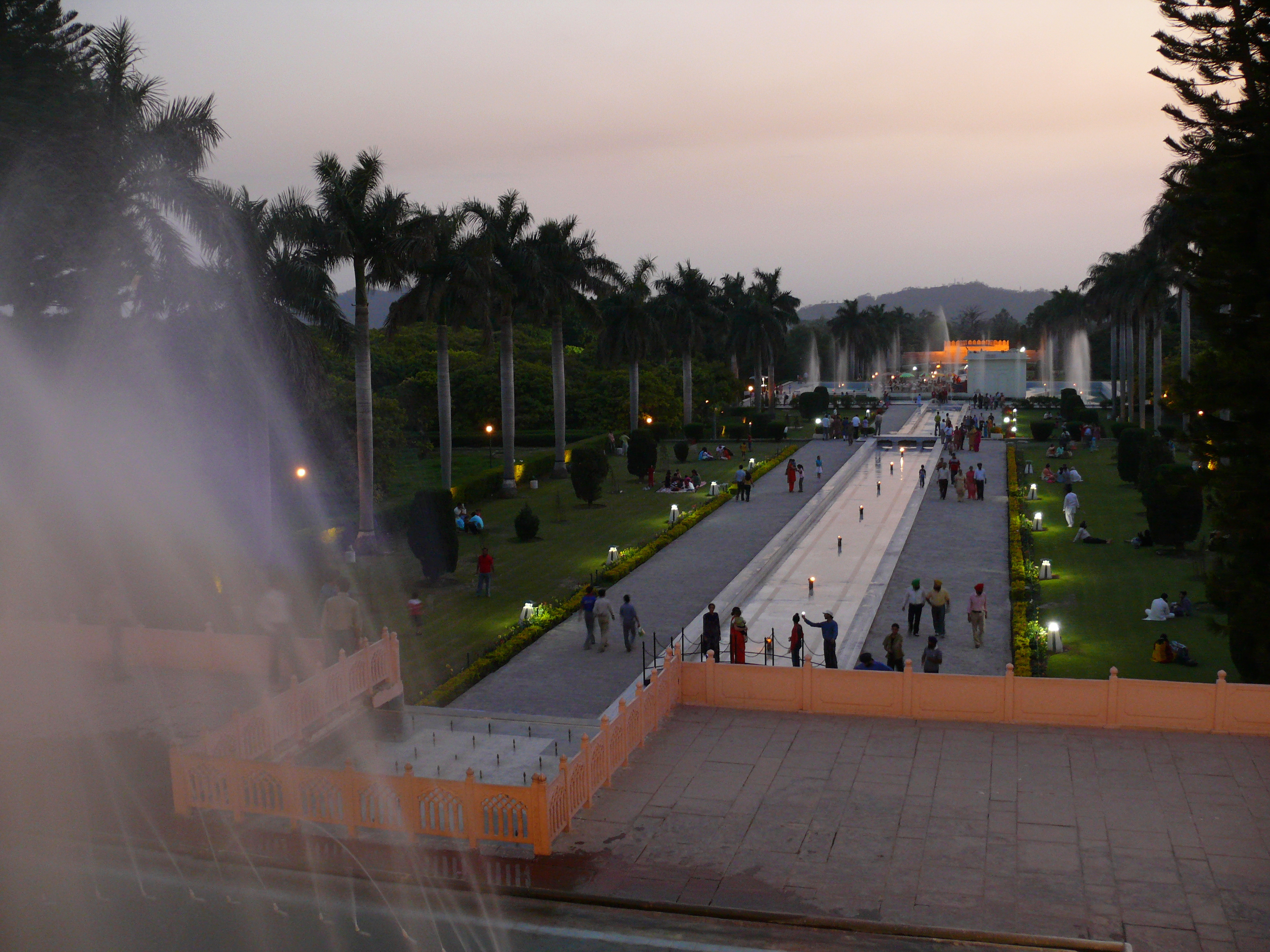
Mughal Gardens in Pinjore in Haryana

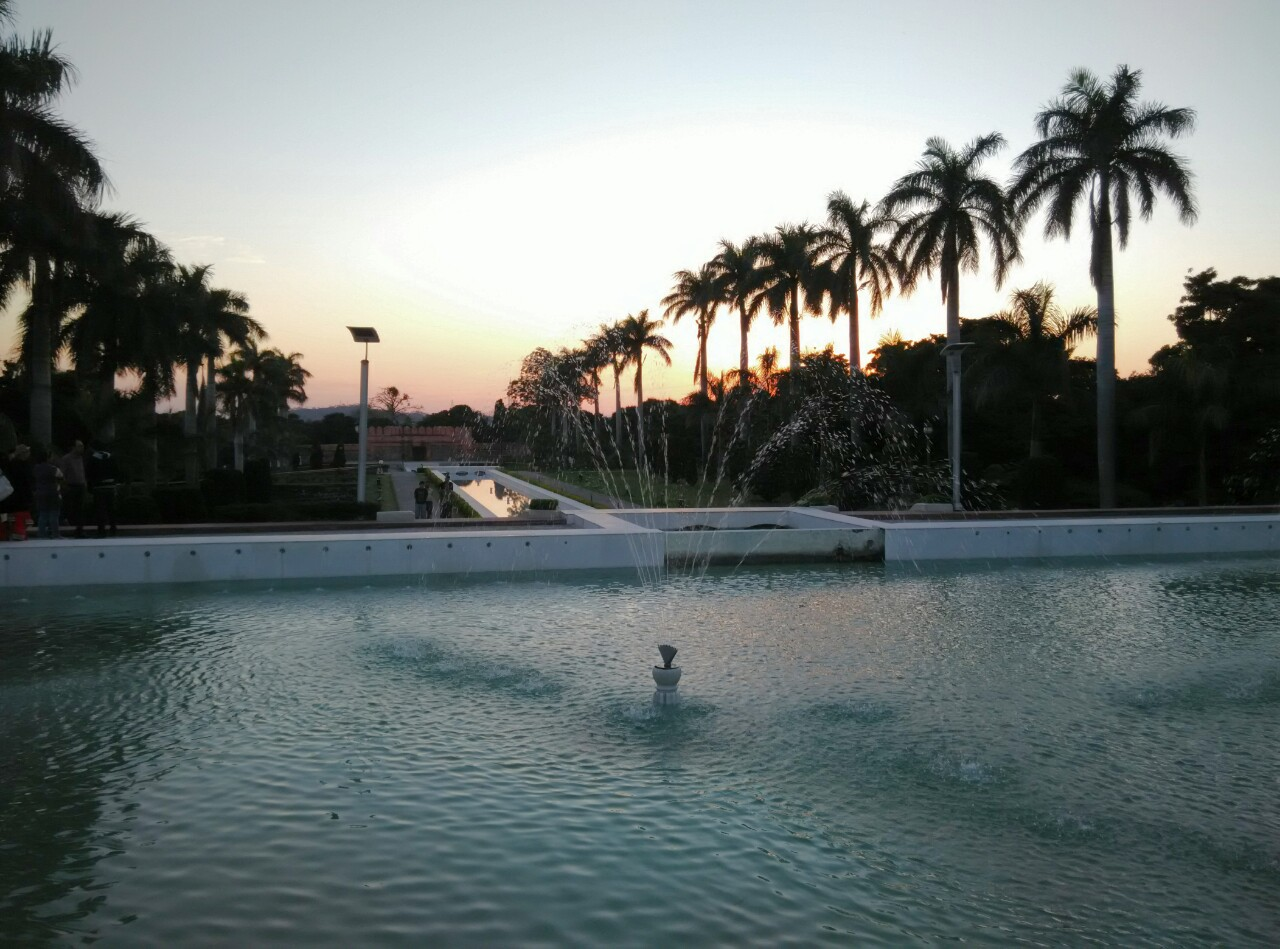
Yadvindra Mughal Gardens, Pinjore, Haryana

It was built in the foothills of Himalayas as one of the Mughal gardens summer retreat for the Aurangzeb (r. 1658–1707), who then had his capital at Lahore, by his foster brother and architect Muzaffar Hussain. He was known as Nawab Fidai Khan Koka and was also Aurangzeb's master of ordnance. He had also supervised the construction of Badshahi Mosque (1671–73) of Lahore. It was built during the early days of Aurangzeb's rule but the accurate date is not known. Since the time of Shah Jahan, mughals reserved the pavilions with Balustered columns supporting the cusped arches only for the use of emperor and his immediate family, hence, it was likely built for Aurangzeb's personal use as summer retreat.

In 1775, the Maharaja of Patiala Amar Singh bought it from the King of Sirmur State Jagat Prakash.

English author-painter C.M. Villiers-Stuart, who resided in the gardens for a time, included a description in her book on "Gardens of the Great Mughals" (1913). She wrote:

"A quaint story still survives, how, when at length the work was finished, and Fadai came in state to spend his first summer there, his enjoyment of the garden and its beauties was short-lived; for the Rajas quickly frightened him away. In the districts round Pinjor, and in fact all along the foot of the Himalayas, occasional cases of goitre are to be seen; so from far and wide these poor people were collected by the wily Brahmins, and produced as the ordinary inhabitants of the place. The gardeners all suffered from goitre; every coolie had this dreadful complaint; even the countrywomen carrying up the big flat baskets of fruits and flowers to the zenana terraces were equally disfigured.

The ladies of the harem naturally were horrified; it was bad enough to be brought into these wild outlandish jungles, without this new and added terror. For the poor coolie women, well instructed beforehand, had told how the air and water of Pinjor caused this disease, which no one who lived there long ever escaped. A panic reigned in the zenana; its inmates implored to be removed at once from such a danger; and finally, Fadai Khan had to give way, and take his ladies to some other place less threatening to their beauty.

Had it been the terrible Emperor himself instead of his foster-brother, the cunning Rajas would have met their match. But Fadai Khan, thoroughly deceived, rarely came back to visit his lovely gardens, and the Rajas and their fields were left in peace for a time."

This stratagem led to the abandonment of the garden by Mughals. Part of the walled outer enclosure of the abandoned garden was demolished in 1793 to build a road. The garden, covered with wild overgrowth, came under the territory ruled by the Maharaja of Patiala during the 19th century British Raj, who used the garden terraces to grow roses for making attar perfume for the maharaja. The Maharaja Yadavindra Singh (1914–74) of the princely state of Patiala restored the garden to its former splendour. In recent times, it has been renamed as Yadavindra Garden in his memory, used as a setting for filming Bollywood movies.

== Architecture ==
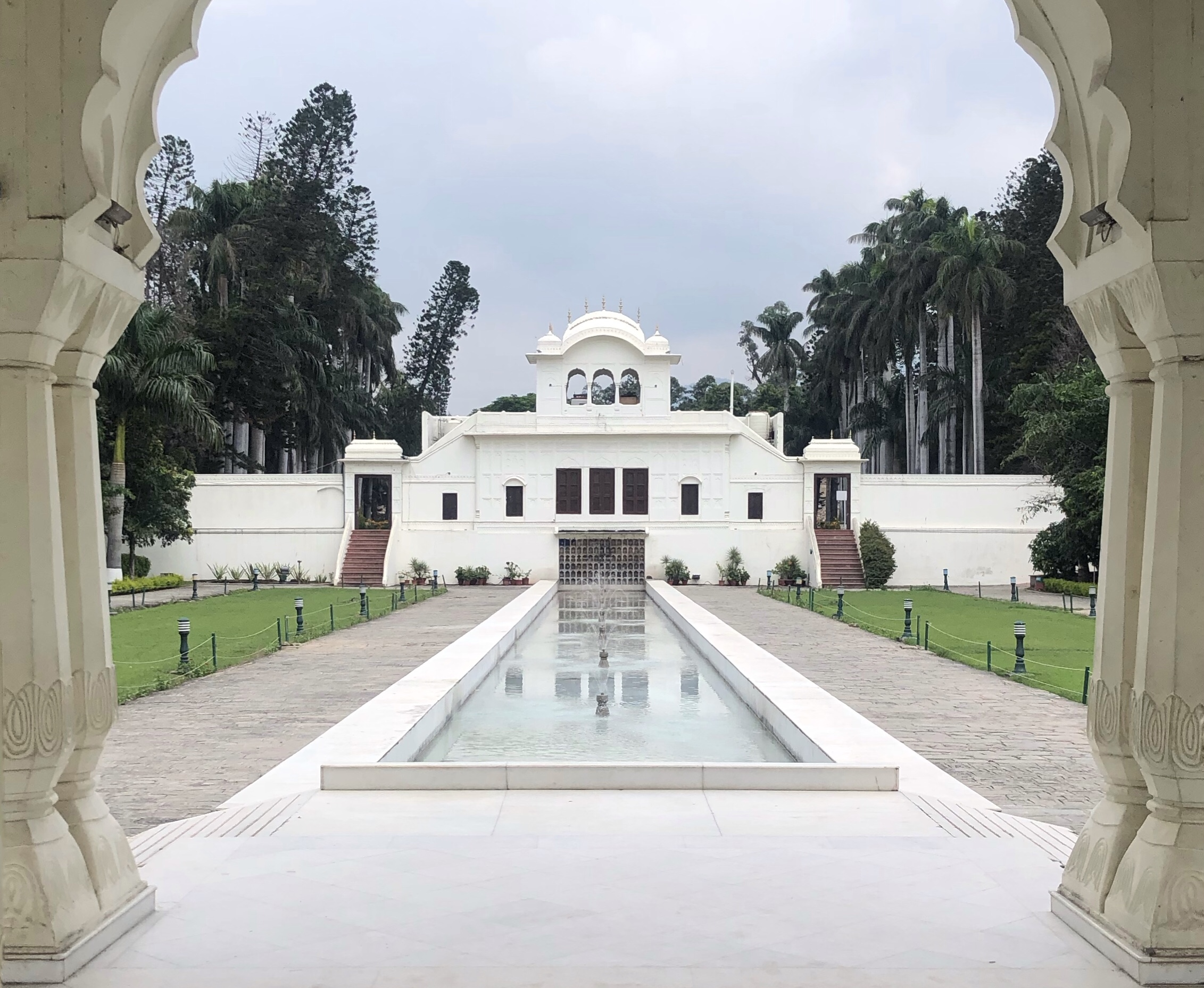
View of the Sheesh Mahal from inside the Rang Mahal at Pinjore Gardens

Built in a similar style to Shalimar Bagh in Kashmir, the garden has been laid in seven terraces, with the main gate of the garden opening into the highest first terrace, which has a palace built in Rajasthani–Mughal style. It is called the “Shish Mahal” (palace of glass), which is adjoined by a romantic "Hawa Mahal" (airy palace). The second terrace with arched doorways has the "Rang Mahal" (painted palace). The third terrace has cypress trees and flowerbeds leading to dense groves of fruit trees. The next terrace has the "Jal Mahal" (palace of water) with a square fountain bed and a platform to relax. Fountains and tree groves are provided in the next terrace. The lowermost terrace has an open-air theatre, which is designed as a disc-like structure.

== Pinjore Garden Site Museum ==
The garden and the temple complex laid in an open-air museum, set up by Haryana State Directorate of Archaeology & Museums, are integrated through drained pathways to remove any water logging. The whole complex has been illuminated at night.

== Pinjore Garden Heritage Train ==
A restored heritage train has been introduced to visit all the monuments and the gardens in the complex.

== Fair and festivals ==
Special festivals such as the Pinjore Baisakhi festival (spring festival) in April, Pinjore Mango Mela in July and Pinjore Heritage Festival in December are major annual celebrations at the gardens.

=== Pinjore Baisakhi Festival ===
Pinjore Baisakhi Festival, a two-day spring festival of Vaisakhi is usually held in April of every year, with regional gourmet food, traditional handlooms and handicrafts, live folk arts and cultural performances, specially by the Haryana State Department of Information, Public Relations & Cultural Affairs at 6 pm.

=== Pinjore Mango Fair ===
Pinjore Mango Festival, a two-days summer mango fair held every second weekend of July since 1992 by Haryana Tourism and Department of Horticulture, Haryana, at the historical Mughal Gardens at Pinjore to celebrate and promote India's status as world's largest producer of the king of fruits mango by encouraging farmers to adopt technology for increasing production and quality. Hundreds of appetising varieties of mangoes from as far as Maharasthra, Bihar, Uttar Pradesh and also from Haryana, Himachal and Punjab arrive here, delighting everyone with their fragrance, taste, hybrid shapes and quality. The festival entails mangoes competition, carts competition for school students, cultural programmes, crafts bazar, food court and evening cultural performances. Government of Haryana decided to upgrade the festival to an international festival from 2018 onward, by inviting competitive entries, exhibitions and cultural performances from all other nations.

Nearly 4,000 entries are received for the competition across different categories of mango, including nearly 3,500 entries for various species of mango and nearly 500 entries of mango products such as pickle, chutney, jam, pulp, juice, squash and mango leather. These entries are judged by the expert scientists from Chaudhary Charan Singh Haryana Agricultural University (Hisar), Maharana Pratap Horticultural University, Karnal, Punjab Agricultural University (Ludhiana), and Indian Agricultural Research Institute (Modipuram, UP). The popular varieties in the competition are Alphonso, Amrapali, Chaunsa, Dasheri, Langra, Malda, Malika, Ramkela pickle variety, Ratol, Totapuri and many more. haryana Kesari (for entries from Haryana), Hind Kesari (for entries from other parts of India) and Aam Kesari (for entries any part of the world) titles are awarded with winners shield and certificate.

A splash of festivities and colours of Harynavi cultural extravaganza make this event far more popular, this attracting mango enthusiasts from all spheres of life. During the day students from different schools perform various competitive cultural programs, such as dance, music, rangoli, etc. In the evening, artistes from the North Zone Cultural Centre present a colourful cultural programme of folk songs and dances, such as Haryanvi music and dance, Punjabi music, Folk dances of Punjab, Himachali folk dances and Indian classical dance.

=== Pinjore Heritage Festival ===
Pinjore Heritage Festival, a two-day winter festival held every year in the last week of December, showcases exquisite cultural heritage of the state and region with cultural performances, dance and music competitions, craft bazar, food court and evening performances. The garden is decorated with lights, cutouts, platforms, decorated gates and illuminations.

== See also ==
- List of Museums in Haryana
