= Malihabad =

Malihabad Hindi: मलीहाबाद Urdu: ملیح آباد
- Town
- Nickname: Mango Capital of the world
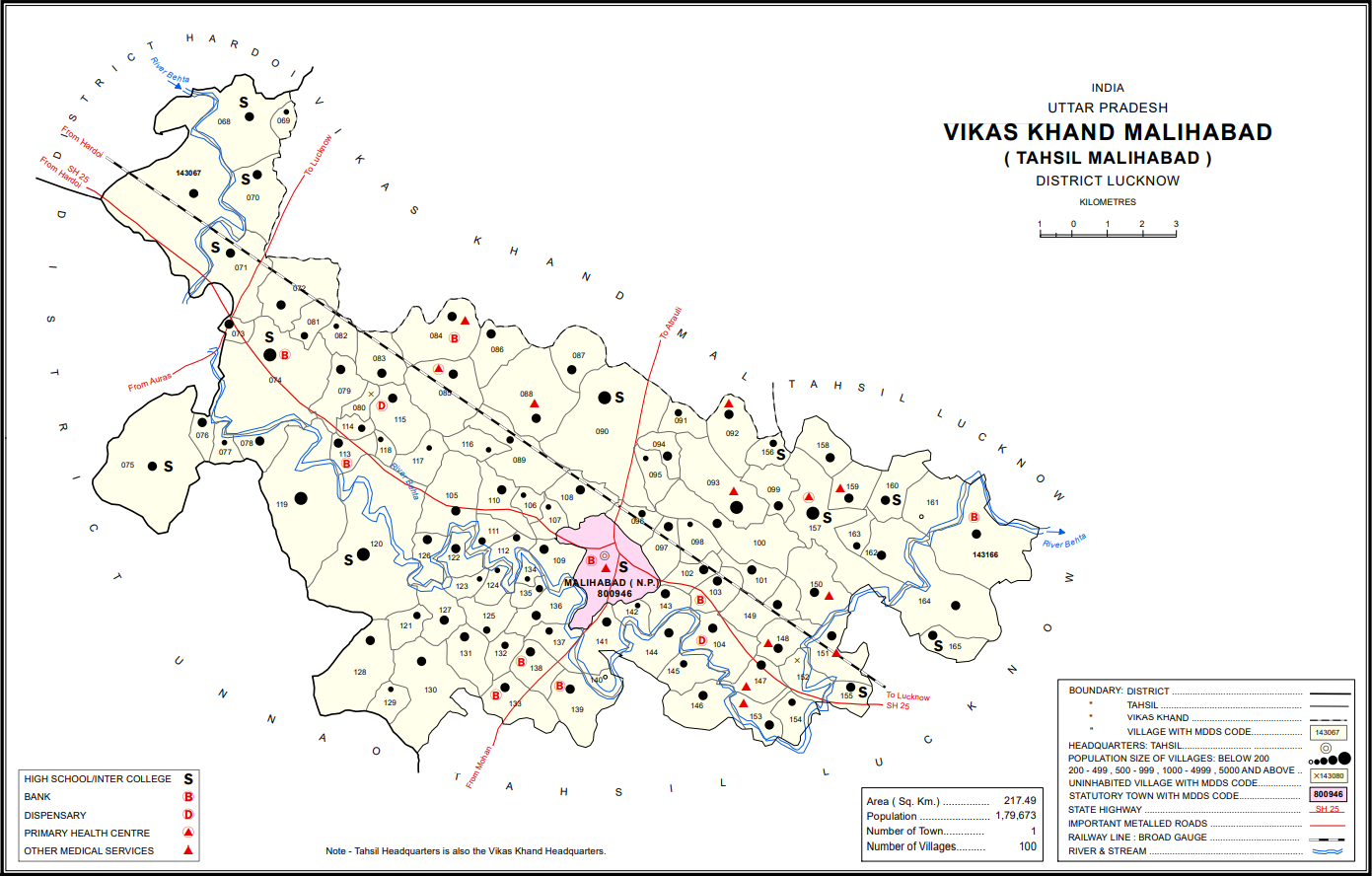
- Map of Malihabad CD block

- Location in Uttar Pradesh, India Malihabad (India)
- Coordinates: 26.94°N 80.72°E
- Country: India
- State: Uttar Pradesh
- District: Lucknow
- Named for: Qazi Malih

Government
  - Type: Mayor

Area
  - Total: 6 km^{2} (2.3 sq mi)
- Elevation: 128 m (420 ft)

Population (2011)
  - Total: 17,818
  - Density: 3,000/km^{2} (7,700/sq mi)

Languages
  - Additional Official: Urdu
  - Official: Hindi
- Time zone: UTC+5:30 (IST)
- Postal code: 226102
- Vehicle registration: UP-32

Malihabad is a town and nagar panchayat in the Lucknow district of Uttar Pradesh, India. It is also the seat of a tehsil and a community development block of the same name. As of 2011, its population was 17,818, in 3,032 households. Malihabad is the largest of Uttar Pradesh's 14 designated mango belts and accounted for 12.5% of all mango production in the state in 2013. Hundreds of mango varieties are grown here, including the Chausa, Langda, Safeda, and most famously the Dasheri, the "king of mangoes" of which it is one of India's main producers and exporters. Mango grower and Padma Shri recipient Haji Kaleem Ullah Khan has contributed to the popularization of Malihabad's mango industry.

Malihabad is also a centre of Chikan embroidery work.

Malihabad has two slum areas called Joshin Tola (pop. 475) and Basti Dhanwant Rai (pop. 589), with 5.97% of the town's population living in them.

Neighbouring places include Garhi Sanjar Khan to the west and Bakhtiyarnagar to the south.

== Geography ==
Malihabad is located at 6.92°N 80.72°E. It has tropical monsoon climate (am), it has warm climate all year round. It has an average elevation of 128 metres (419 feet).The main areas in Malihabad are Mirzaganj, Syedwara, Chaudrana and Kewalhar. Malihabad's major population belongs to the rural areas and there are most probably 187 villages and 67 gram panchayats also included under the tahsheel of Malihabad.

== History ==
Malihabad was historically the seat of a pargana, as mentioned in the Ain-i-Akbari. At the time of Shah Jahan it was colonized by Ammanzai Pathans, who became the primary landowners. During the reign of Safdarjung, the Pathan landlords Yaar Beg Khan Afridi, Baaz Khan Afridi, Karam Khan Afridi and others were granted a part of Malihabad, known as Kawalhar. In 1257H Nawab Faqir Muhammad khan Goya Grandson of Yaar Beg Khan Afridi became the commander-in-chief in the army of Ghazi-ud-Din Haidar Shah. He became enamored with Malihabad and requested permission from the Nawab to grow mangoes here, thus establishing the first mango plantation in Malihabad

== Demographics ==
Religion in Malihabad (2011)
Religion	Percent
Islam	61.67%
Hinduism	38.14%
Sikhism	0.01%
Christianity	0.15%
Buddhism	0.01%
Jainism	0.01%
Others	0.01%

As of 2001 India census, Malihabad had a population of 15,806. Males constitute 53% of the population and females 47%. Malihabad has an average literacy rate of 52%, lower than the national average of 59.5%: male literacy is 59%, and female literacy is 45%. In Malihabad, 16% of the population is under 6 years of age.

== Economics ==
Dasheri mango plantations are one of the major income sources of the region, with mangoes being exported to many neighbouring countries.

Vegetables are another major export here.

== In film and television ==
The Filmfare Award winner (1979) and winner of National Film Award for Best Feature Film in Hindi (1978), film Junoon was mostly shot in the Mahals of Malihabad. The 1978 Urdu film was produced by Shashi Kapoor and directed by Shyam Benegal and was a hit of its time. The film was based on Ruskin Bond novella A Flight of Pigeons.

Malihabad and its famous mangoes are mentioned several times in the 2004 film Lakshya.

== Villages ==
Malihabad block contains the following 100 villages:

Village name	Total land area (hectares)	Population (in 2011)
Sahijana	800.3	2,420
Rusena	523.7	4,615
Chaina	54.8	474
Jauria	274	1,858
Tarauna	465.6	2,992
Kaithulia	352.1	2,566
Fatehpur	44.8	1,215
Jindaur	913.6	12,323
Mavai Kalan	692.4	4,433
Daulatpur	69.9	1,041
Bhat Purva	100	460
Tiragavan	87.3	1,418
Mankauti	190.4	2,697
Raghu Rampur	80.8	0
Terva	81.1	510
Belva	82	484
Gosava	169.3	1,542
Dilawarnagar	320.2	3,456
Kahala	342.3	4,047
Harihar Pur	172.4	1,305
Bhadesar Mau	196.4	1,456
Sendharava	420.1	2,840
Ishapur	105.2	959
Kasmandi Khurd	33.6	328
Firozpur	81	810
Bhujasa	134.4	2,662
Sadarpur	82.7	450
Mohammadnagar Talukdari	151.8	1,298
Mohammadnagar Rahmatnagar	350.4	2,216
Nai Basti Dhanewa	130.5	1,539
Nejabhari	116.7	1,003
Mahmudnagar	149.1	2,390
Kanar	252.5	1,805
Ahmedabad	301.5	3,524
Najar Nagar	57.9	373
Tikari Khurd	63.1	430
Sarava	171.1	1,534
Garhi Sajar Khan	104.6	2,833
Madhopur	353.4	2,474
Badaura	110.2	954
Shahjad Pur	80	661
Khushal Pur	93.9	1,445
Bhatoia	60.9	986
Surgaula	237.2	1,313
Hasimpur	93	368
Chandpur	139.3	481
Rasulabad	52.6	385
Gaunda Muajjam Nagar	780.9	5,810
Khar Kuwa	989.9	5,694
Paharpur	147.5	732
Virahim Pur	122.8	1,154
Rampur Basti	53.8	397
Gaurava	57.7	384
Datali	101.4	710
Rasulpur	137.7	1,219
Ataura	159.5	1,007
Mahdoia	384.8	1,711
Bhogalamau	82.2	324
Navi Nagar	371.8	1,909
Kharata	164.3	1,674
Bhulsi	103.9	875
Dheremau	230.8	2,053
Kundara Kalan	32.1	483
Kundara Khurd	71.7	753
Bhausa (Sherpur)	179.4	1,463
Dular Mau	117.4	944
Purava	142	1,463
Tilsua	182.1	1,450
Bari Jalalpur	37.7	182
Bakhtiyarnagar	190.6	2,480
Kukura	102.8	309
Barhi Garhi	166.5	1,684
Belgarha	142.5	1,452
Ludhausi	129	892
Khalispur	225.1	2,832
Habibpur	148.6	1,049
Dugauli	178.8	1,036
Sahilamau	303.6	3,271
Meethenagar	268.3	1,149
Mandauli	199.1	2,404
Sahilabad	44.6	0
Allupur	109	1,296
Budharia	123.4	783
Tikaitganj	92.5	1,095
Vajidnagar	83.3	832
Kasmandikala	561.5	6,005
Ramgarha	205.4	1,336
Kithai Para	153.6	1,225
Bahelia	185.6	1,412
Gukhaura	233.7	123
Fatehnagar	228.3	1,346
Shivdaspur	45.6	688
Katauli	418	3,380
Jamalnagar	133.9	1,072
Malaha	579.3	2,867

== Notable people ==
- Nawab Faqir Muhammad khan Goya, Warrior, Writer, Poet
- Ghaus Mohammad Khan, sportsperson
- Josh Malihabadi, writer, revolutionary poet
- Maulana Abdur Razzaq Malihabadi, Islamic Scholar, Writer, Journalist, Freedom Fighter.
- Prof. Khan Muhammad Atif , Persian Scholar, Ex. MLA, Writer, HOD Persian Department University of Lucknow
- Mohsin Khan, Urdu fiction writer and novelist.
- Ahmad Saeed Malihabadi, Ex. Member of Parliament, Writer, Journalist.
- Kaleem Ullah Khan, Mango farmer
- Zafaryab Jilani – Senior advocate known for representing the Muslim side in the Ram Janmabhoomi–Babri Masjid case.

== Historical Landmarks ==
Barah Kamba (Shamir Khan Tomb)
