= Mahmudnagar =

Village in Uttar Pradesh, India

Mahmudnagar Mahmūdnagar
- Village
- Location in Uttar Pradesh, India Mahmudnagar (India)
- Coordinates: 26.90944°N 80.73403°E
- Country: India
- State: Uttar Pradesh
- District: Lucknow

Area
  - Total: 1.491 km^{2} (0.576 sq mi)
- Elevation: 128 m (420 ft)

Population (2011)
  - Total: 2,390
  - Density: 1,600/km^{2} (4,150/sq mi)

Languages
  - Official: Hindi
- Time zone: UTC+5:30 (IST)

Mahmudnagar, also spelled Mahmoodnagar, is a village in Malihabad block of Lucknow district, Uttar Pradesh, India. As of 2011, its population is 2,390, in 394 households. It is the seat of a gram panchayat, which also includes the village of Nejabhari.
