= Kaleem Ullah Khan (horticulturist) =

Indian horticulturist and fruit breeder

Haji Kalimullah Khan
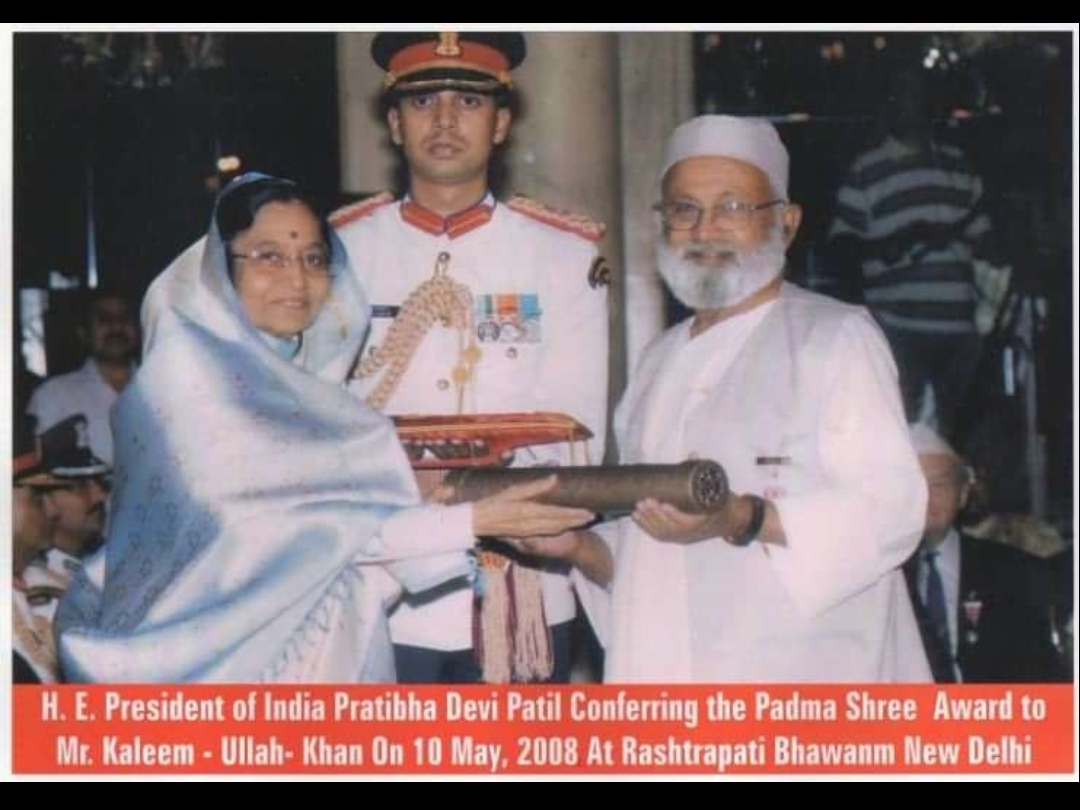
- Khan (right) receiving the Padma Shri award in 2008
- Born: Malihabad, Lucknow, Uttar Pradesh, India
- Other name: Mango man
- Education: 7th Standard
- Occupation: Horticulturist
- Known for: Mango grafting
- Awards: Padma Shri

Haji Kalimullah Khan, popularly known as Mango man, is an Indian horticulturist and fruit breeder, known for his accomplishments in breeding mangoes and other fruits. He is known to have grown over 300 different varieties of mangoes on a single tree, using grafting techniques.

== Early life ==
Born in Malihabad, near Lucknow in the Indian state of Uttar Pradesh, Khan dropped out of school at 7th standard and took to the family business of farming. Using the asexual propagation technique of grafting, he has developed several new varieties of mangoes, some of which has been named after celebrities and political leader such as Sachin Tendulkar, Aishwarya Rai, Akhilesh Yadav, Sonia Gandhi, Narendra Modi, Amit Shah etc. Anarkali, a variety of mango developed by him is reported to have two different skins and two different layers of pulp, each having a different taste. The Government of India awarded him the fourth highest civilian honour of the Padma Shri, in 2008, for his contributions to horticulture.

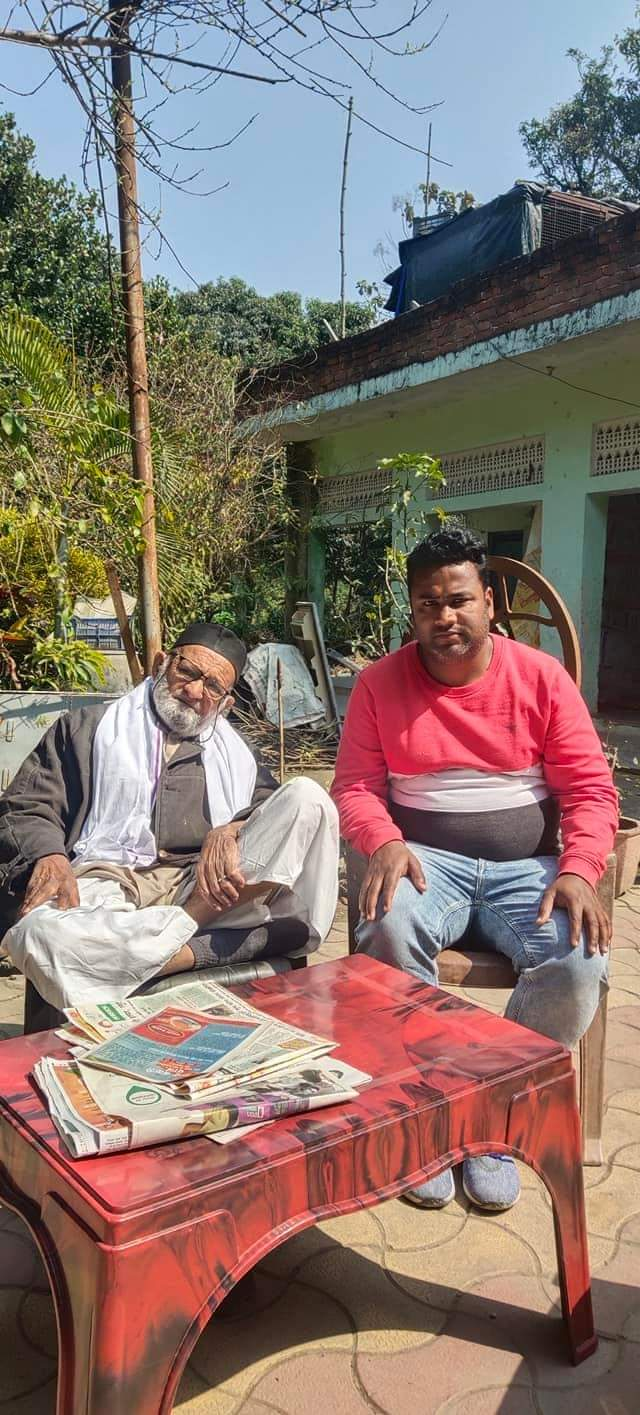
Khan (left) in 2022
