= Kasmandi Kalan =

- Village
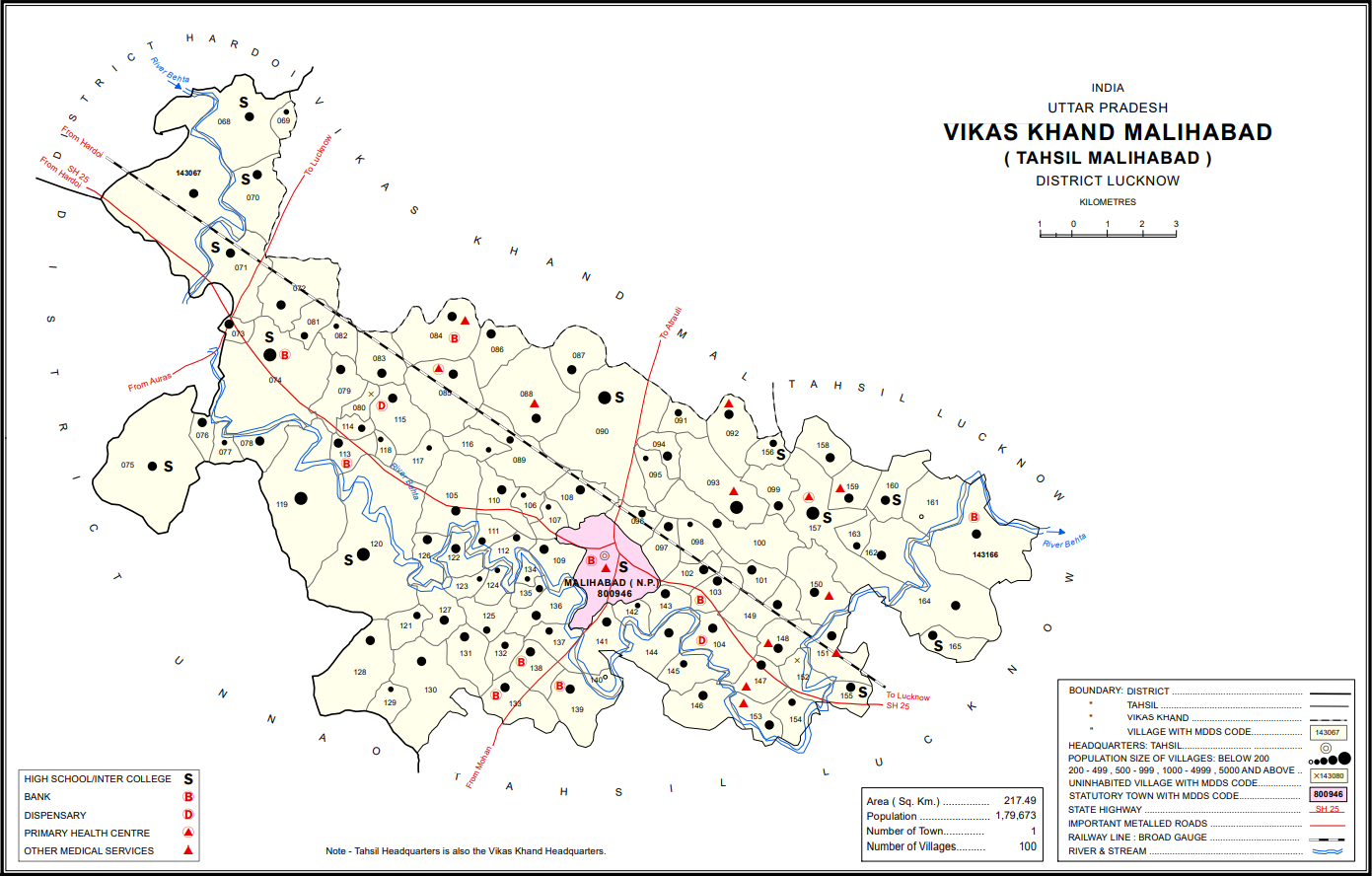
- Map showing Kasmandi Kalan (#157) in Malihabad CD block

- Location in Uttar Pradesh, India Kasmandi Kalan (India)
- Coordinates: 26.93°N 80.77°E
- Country: India
- State: Uttar Pradesh
- District: Lucknow

Population (2011 Census of India)
  - Total: 6,005

Languages
  - Official: Hindi
- Time zone: UTC+5:30 (IST)
- PIN: 226102

Kasmandi Kalan is a Village in Malihabad block of Lucknow district, Uttar Pradesh, India. It is located 27 km away from central Lucknow, a short distance to the north of the Behta River. The village lands include two settlements, Kasmandi Kalan proper in the north and the hamlet of Hafiznagar to the south. Historically known as a Muslim centre, Kasmandi Kalan is renowned for its mango orchards (Aam ke Bag) and is surrounded by mango trees all around. Some mango groves here are very old, dating back to the time of the Nawabs of Awadh.

As of 2011, Kasmandi Kalan has a population of 6,005 people, in 1,079 households. It has all facilities like water supply (limited hours), petrol pumps and a railway station nearly 6 kilometers away. Like the other villages it too has its governing head, a Pradhan, who is elected every five years.

== History ==
Kasmandi Kalan is said to be named after one Raja Kans, who was defeated and killed by Sayed Salar Masood Ghazi. Tombs said to belong to some of Salar Masud's companions are found around the village, with three of the most important being those of the Sayyids Salar/Commander Hashim, Qasim and Shahabuddin. At the turn of the 20th century, Kasmandi Kalan hosted a small market once per week and had a post office and a "flourishing" school. The school had previously had an affiliated girls' school, but by then the girls' school had closed down. Its population as of the 1901 census was 2,008, including 780 Muslims.

The 1961 census recorded Kasmandi Kalan as consisting of 2 hamlets, with a total population of 2,338 (1,202 male and 1,136 female), in 471 households and 414 physical houses. The village lands were given as covering 1,401 acres. The village market, held twice weekly on Mondays and Fridays and centred around trade in cloth and handloom, had an average attendance of 800 people at the time.

The 1981 census recorded Kasmandi Kalan as having a population of 4,483 people, in 842 households, and covering an area of 883.46 hectares.
