= Bakhtiyarnagar =

Village in Uttar Pradesh, India

- Village
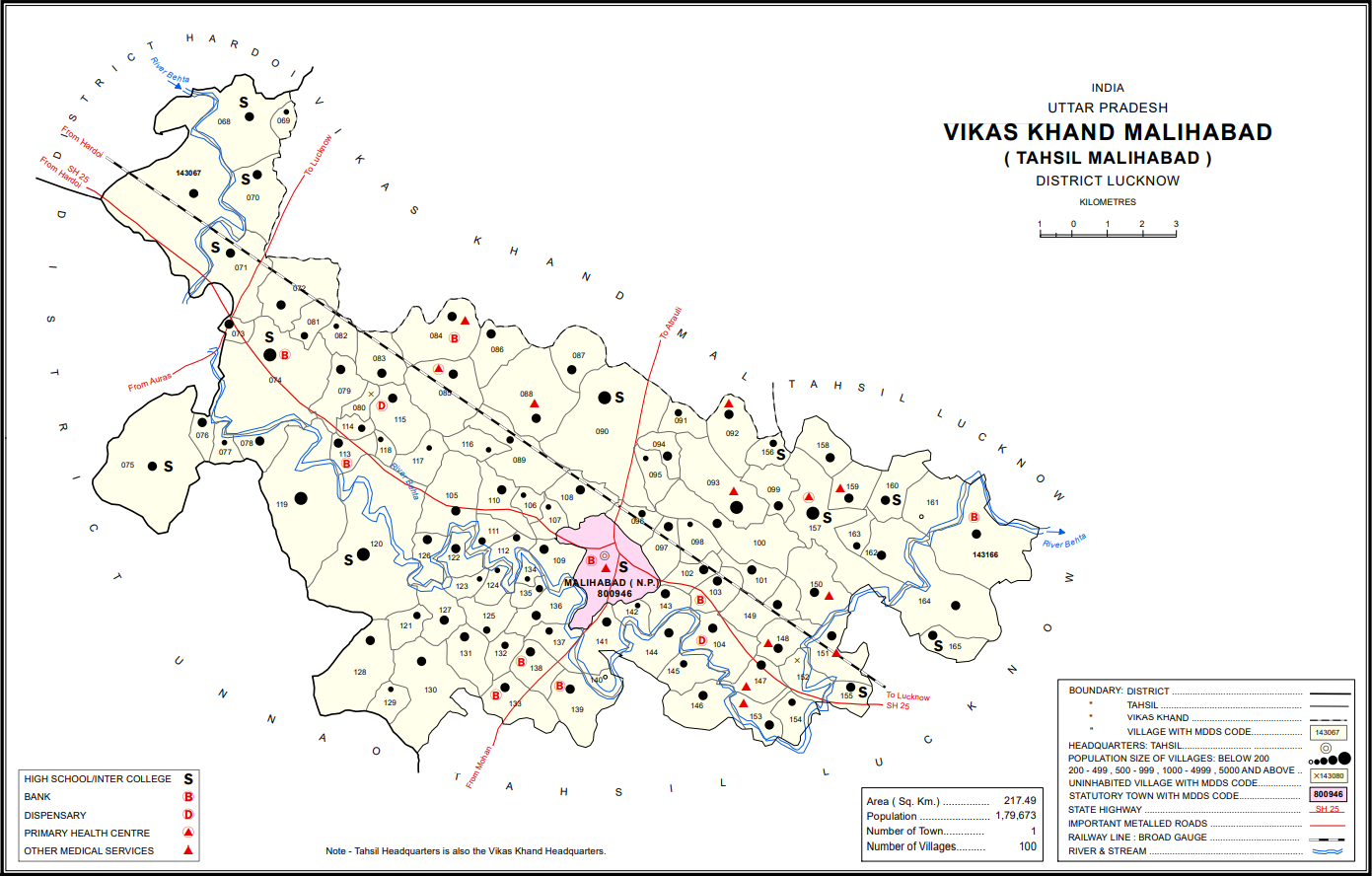
- Map showing Bakhtiyarnagar (#141) in Malihabad CD block

- Location in Uttar Pradesh, India Bakhtiyarnagar (India)
- Country: India
- State: Uttar Pradesh
- District: Lucknow

Area
  - Total: 1.906 km^{2} (0.736 sq mi)

Population (2011)
  - Total: 2,480
  - Density: 1,300/km^{2} (3,370/sq mi)

Languages
  - Official: Hindi
- Time zone: UTC+5:30 (IST)

Bakhtiyarnagar is a village in Malihabad block of Lucknow district, Uttar Pradesh, India. It is located immediately to the south of the town of Malihabad. The main staple foods here are wheat and rice. As of 2011, Bakhtiyarnagar's population is 2,480, in 456 households.

== History ==
Bakhtiyarnagar was the seat of a branch of the Amanzai Pathans, who had originally settled in nearby Garhi Sanjar Khan in 1656. One member, Sarmast Khan, branched off and moved to Bakhtiyarnagar in 1693. His son, Dilawar Khan, achieved high rank under the Mughal emperor Farrukhsiyar, receiving mansabdar status and the title "Nawab Shamsher Khan". He amassed an estate of over 100 villages and was granted a jagir of 3 lakhs of rupees. However, his son Makarim Khan fell into disfavour during the time of Safdar Jang and, realising he was distrusted, fled to Rohilkhand. His jagir was confiscated, although Bakhtiyarnagar and a few other villages were later restored to him through the intervention of the Rohilla leader Hafiz Rahmat Khan. Bakhtiyarnagar then remained under his descendants' control through the early 20th century.

At the turn of the 20th century, Bakhtiyarnagar was described as a small village with a lower primary school and a bazaar that held weekly markets. The village lands were under extensive cultivation and irrigated by wells; about 10% of the village lands were covered by orchards. Its population in 1901 was 1,476 people, including 682 Muslims.

The 1961 census recorded Bakhtiyarnagar (as "Bakhtiarnagar") as comprising 1 hamlet, with a total population of 1,355 (719 male and 636 female), in 260 households and 201 physical houses. The area of the village was given as 477 acres.

The 1981 census recorded Bakhtiyarnagar as having a population of 1,543 people, in 276 households, and covering an area of 192.64 hectares.
