= Chaunsa =

Edible fruit cultivar

Mangifera 'Chaunsa'
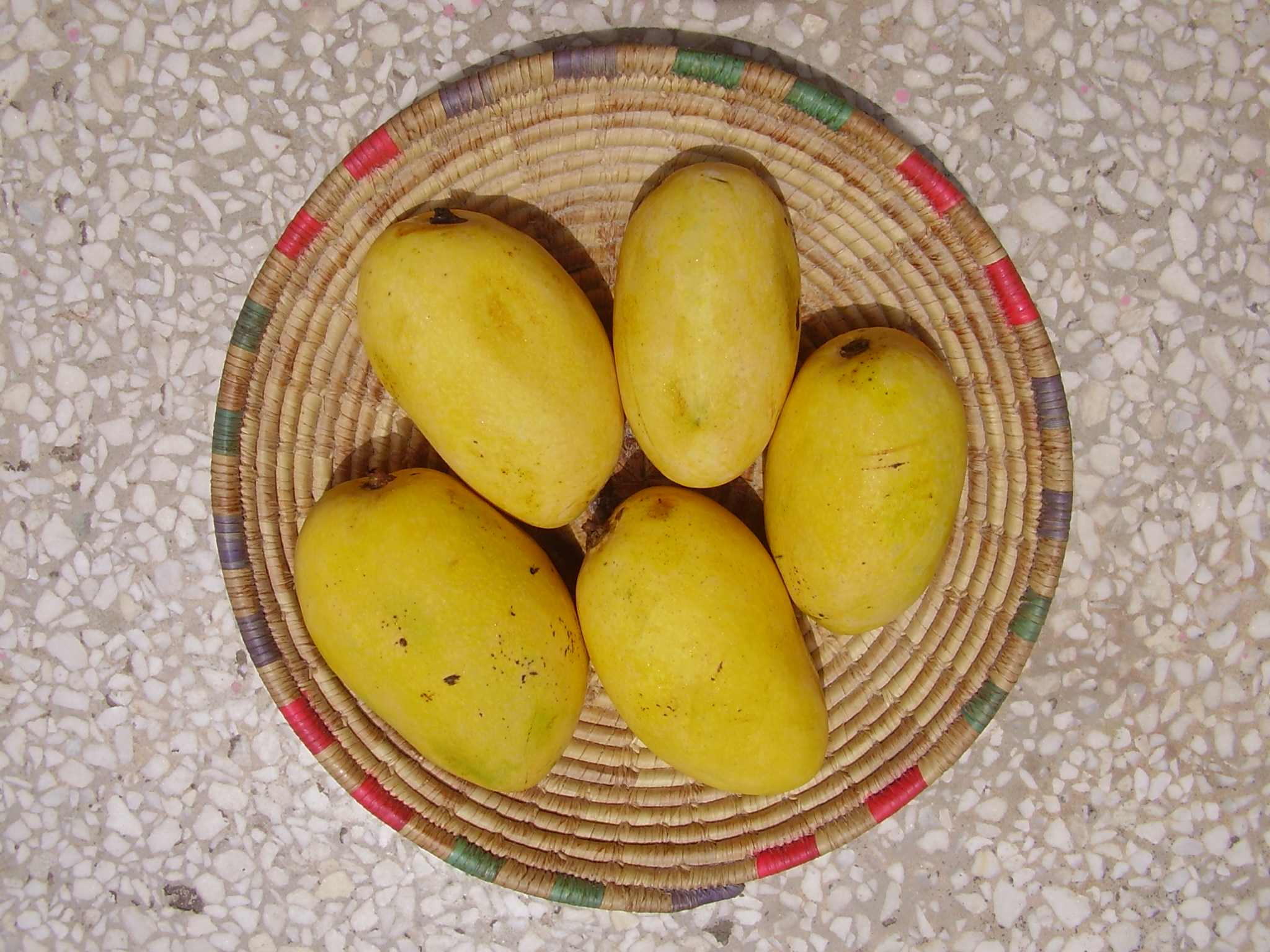
- Genus: Mangifera
- Species: Mangifera indica

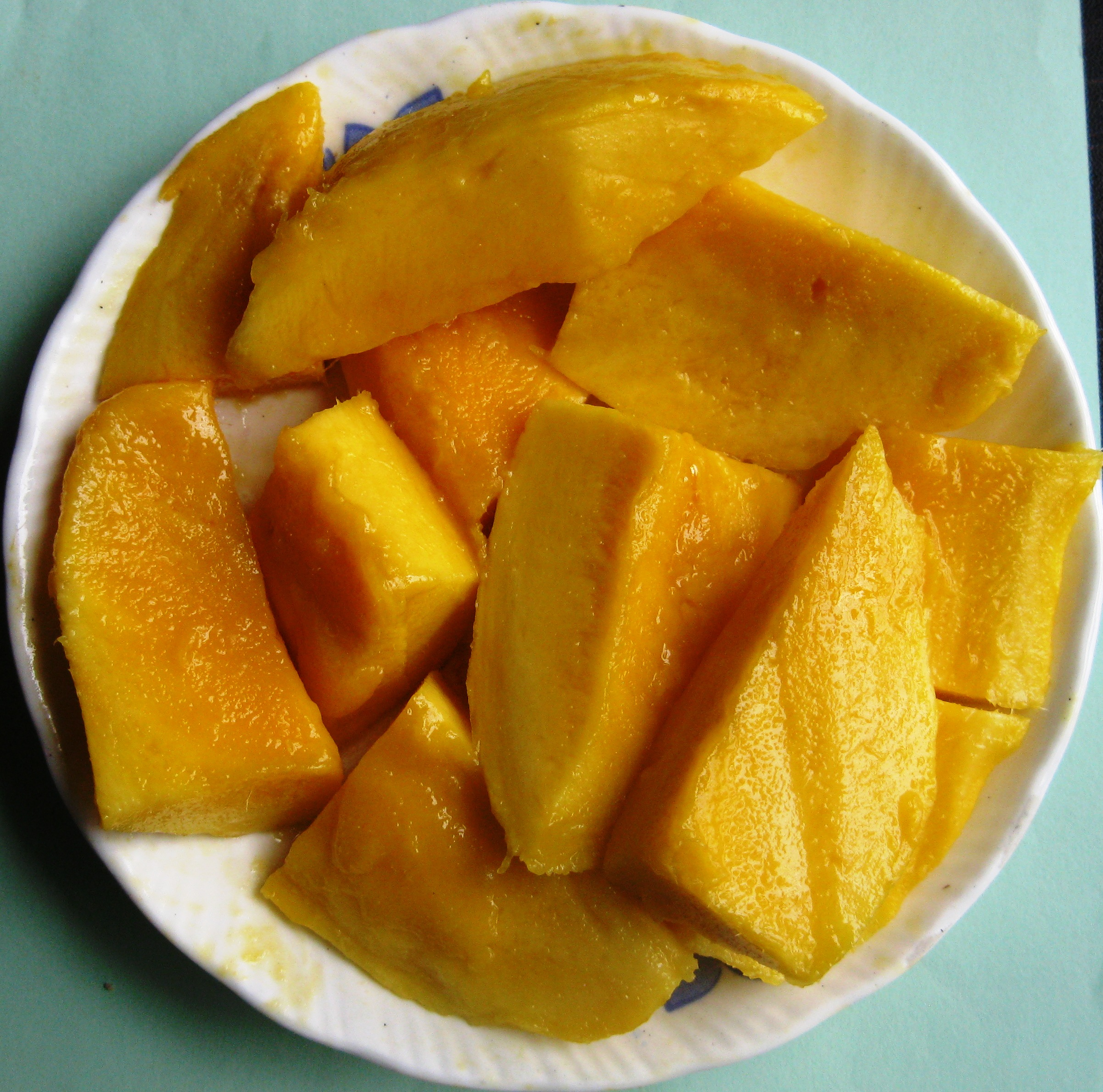
'Chaunsa' mango (sliced)

Chaunsa (Bangla: চৌসা, Bhojpuri: चउसा, Hindi: चौंसा, Urdu: چونسا), also known as chausa, is a mango cultivar indigenous to South Asia. It is grown mainly in India and Pakistan; both countries export significant quantities of the fruit.

The main centers of chaunsa cultivation are the states of Bihar & Uttar Pradesh in India and Rahim Yar Khan and Multan in Pakistani province of Punjab.

== History ==
The Chausa mango, also known as Samar Bahisht ("Fruit of Paradise"), was first grafted on a large scale by Abdul Hameed Khan Malihabadi of Malihabad, India. His son, Dr. Sami Khan 'Azad' Malihabadi, later migrated to Pakistan and was instrumental in introducing this mango variety there. The first plantations in Pakistan were established in the Sindh region.

== Etymology ==
The chaunsa variety of mango was made popular by the Indian ruler Sher Shah Suri while commemorating his victory over Humayun at Chausa, Bihar. Suri ultimately named his favorite mango "chaunsa" to honor his victory. The mango was also known as the Ghazipuriya mango due to its early large-scale cultivation in Ghazipur.

== Description ==
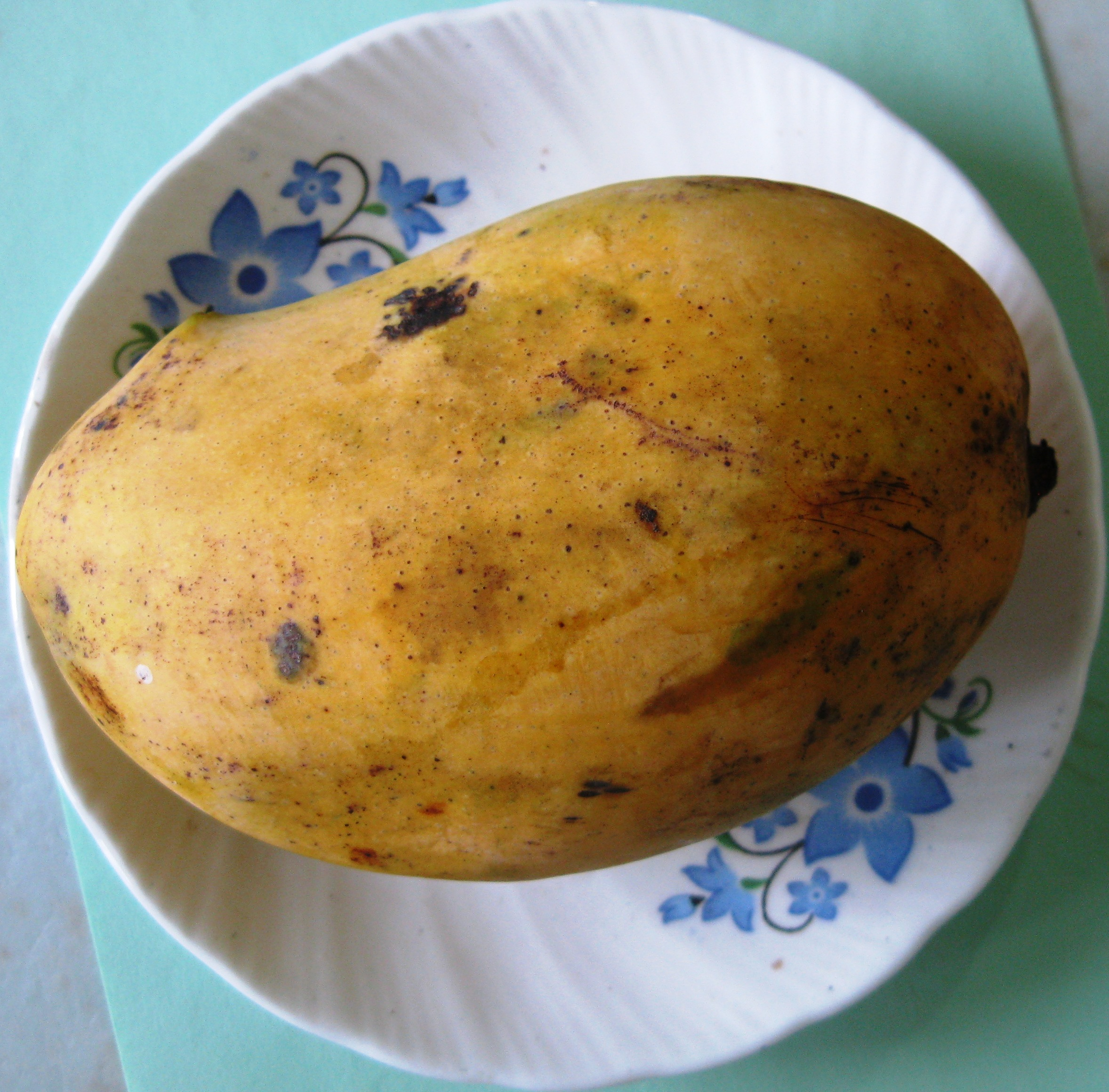
'Chaunsa' mango

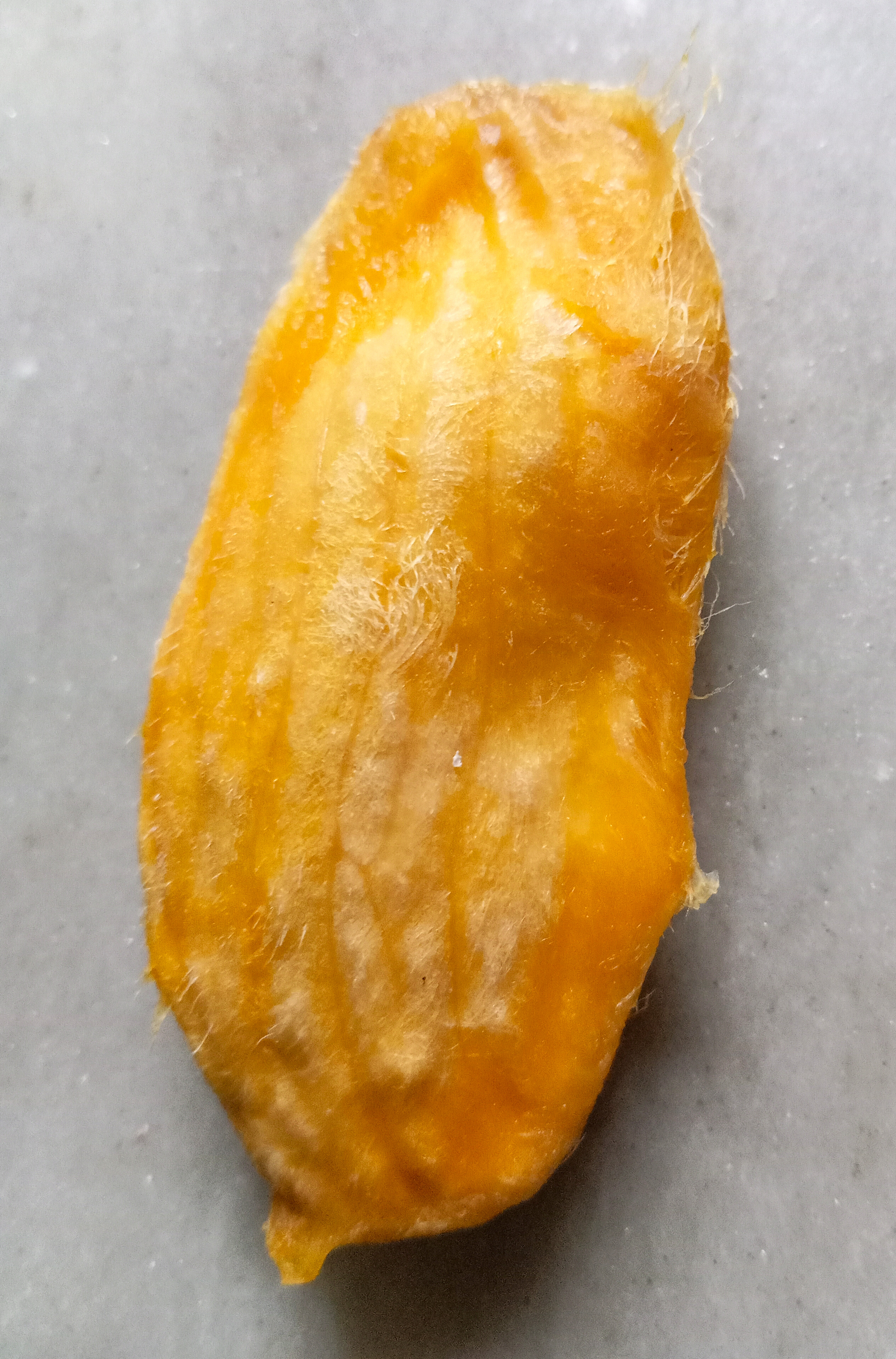
'Chaunsa' mango stone (seed)

The fruit has a golden-yellow color when it is soft, is almost fiberless, and has an aromatic, pleasant, sweet flavor. Commonly available varieties in Pakistan are greenish-yellow. The unique taste and richness in its flavor makes it a worldwide favorite. Some consider it the best mango in terms of its rich aroma, sweet taste, juicy pulp and high nutritional value. Chaunsas have higher vitamin C content than other mango cultivars.

Chaunsa season in India and Pakistan normally starts at the beginning of June and ends in the third week of August. It is heavily exported to the Middle East, Europe, Canada, and most recently to the United States. Prior to its availability in the U.S., some American chaunsa aficionados would travel to Canada in order to legally purchase the mango. There are four known types of chaunsa mangoes: Mosami Chaunsa (Summer Bahisht), Kala Chaunsa (Black), Safaid chaunsa (White) and Azeem Chaunsa (Rattewala). White chaunsa is generally considered ideal for exports due to its longer shelf life.
