= Fidai Khan Koka =

Subahdar of Bengal from 1676 to 1677

- Nawab; Sipahsalar

25th Subahdar of Bengal
- Reign: 1676–1677
- Predecessor: Shaista Khan
- Successor: Azam Shah
- Badshah: Aurangzeb
- Born: Muzaffar Hussain
Names
- Muzaffar Hussain
- Religion: Islam

Fidai Khan Koka, (Note: Koka is suffix for foster brother) born Muzaffar Hussain, was a Mughal noble who was the governor of Awadh and Lahore, the Mughal master of ordnance and a foster brother to the Mughal Emperor Aurangzeb. Aurangzeb had two foster-brothers, Fidai and Bahadur Khan, who was Aurangzeb's favourite. Fidai Khan was credited with leading construction on the Mughal gardens known as the Pinjore Gardens near Chandigarh, the Teele Wali Masjid (1658–1660) in Lucknow, and the Badshahi Mosque (1671–1673) in Lahore.

== Biography ==
At first he was darogha of the imperial court, and afterwards he was sent as ambassador to Bijapur to convey some presents to the Bijapuri Sultan. In 1649 he was an officer the Tüzük department. in the 23rd year of Shah Jahan (1650) he was made bakhshi of the Ahadis, and in 1651 he had the rank of 1000 with 400 horse and was made bakhshi of the mansabdars of Kabul, and darogha of the artillery there. In 1653 he came to court and was promoted to the chief of the Tuzuk department. After that be was made superintendent of the special elephants. in the 29th year he was made superintendent of the mace-bearers, and the post of Mir Tuzuk was again added to his duties. He had an increase of 500 with 200 horse, and in the beginning of 1657 he had the title of Fidai Khan conferred upon him.

Soon after Aurangzeb's ascension, the emperor despatched Fidai Khan along with Shaista Khan amir-ul-umara (the future governor of Bengal) to capture his nephew, Sulaiman Shikoh. Khan went ahead of the Amir-ul-umara to Buriya and learnt that Sulaiman Shikoh wished to go with the assistance of Prithi Singh, the ruler of Srinagar, by the crossing at Haridwar to Lahore. Fidai travelled eighty kos in twenty-four hours and arrived at Haridwar. On account of his arrival, Sulaiman Shikoh was unable to cross and had to go to the hill-country, to Srinagar. Fidai then returned to court and obtained leave to go with Khalil Ullah Khan, who had been appointed to pursue Sulaiman's father, prince Dara Shikoh. At the time when Aurangzeb came to Qasur with the intention of proceeding to Multan, he was summoned to the presence, and on the death of Iradat Khan, the şubahdar of Oudh, he was made faujdar thereof and of Gorakhpur. After the battle with Shuja and his flight, he was appointed to assist Muazzam Khan Mir Jumla II and attached to prince Sultan Muhammad, son of Aurangzeb and directed to pursue Shuja. When Sultan Muhammad decided to join his uncle's rebellion against his father, Mir Jumla, in accordance with orders, sent Fidai Khan with a body of troops to take charge of the prince and to conduct him to court. In 1662 he became Mir Atish (superintendent of artillery), and received a robe of honour.

In 1674 the emperor appointed Fidai Khan the governor of Kabul, where he put down rebellions of the local tribes. Near Jalalabad he gathered his forces, attacked the rebels and put them to flight despite being almost overwhelmed by their numbers, after which he attacked and destroyed the rebel tribes' villages. The emperor lauded his endeavors and gave him the title of Azim Khan Koka. In 1676 he was recalled to the court and was made the Governor of Bengal. The next year prince Muhammad Azam was made governor of Bengal, and Fidai was transferred to Bihar. However, before he could start his journey, he died in Dhaka on 21 May, 1678.

== Family ==
He had left two known sons. His elder son, Muhammad Salih Khan was given the title of Fidai Khan after his father's death. He was the faujdar of Berilly and, following Shaista Khan amir-ul-umara's death, the governor of Agra. In 1702 he was made the faujdar of Darbhanga and Trihut, and was made a commander of 3000 with 2000 horse. His younger son, Safdar Khan Koka, was married to the daughter of his uncle and Fidai Khan Koka's younger brother, Khan Jahan Bahadur Kokaltash. Safdar served as the faujdar of Gwalior during the latter part of Aurangzeb's reign and died of a gunshot wound while attacking a fort in 1691.

== Legacy ==
Pinjore Garden was built during the early days of Aurangzeb's rule, however the exact dates of completion are not known. Since the time of Shah Jahan, the Mughals reserved the pavilions with Balustered columns supporting the cusped arches only for the use of the Shahanshah and his immediate family, hence, it was likely built for Aurangzeb's personal use as a summer retreat.

== Gallery ==
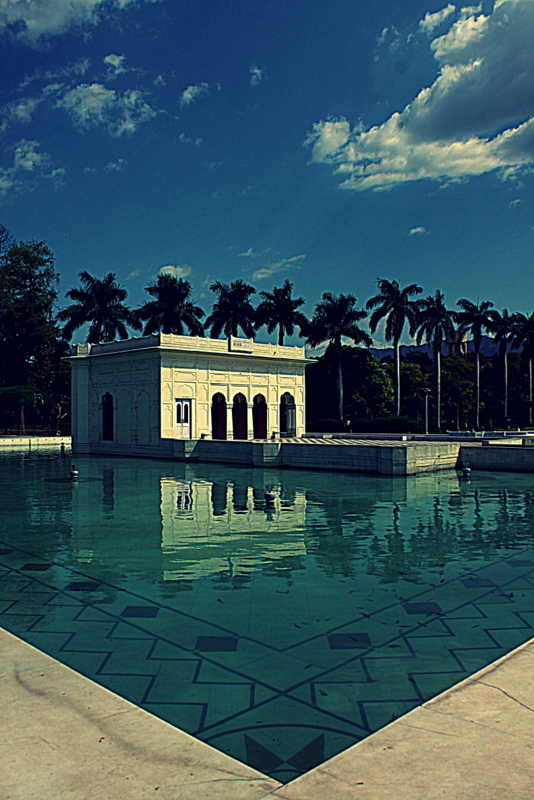
Pinjore sarovar within the Mughal Gardens

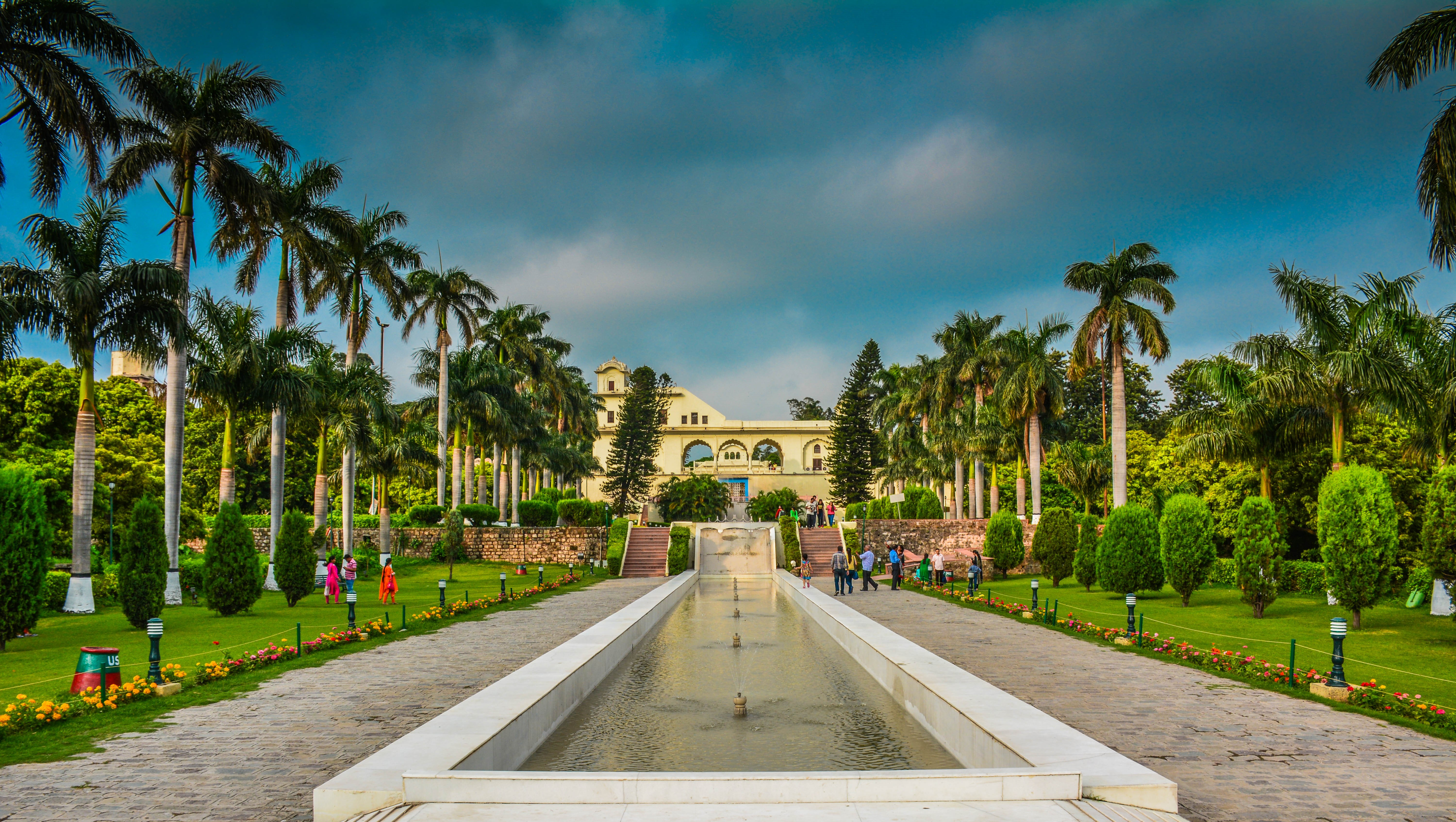
Main hayat in Pinjore.

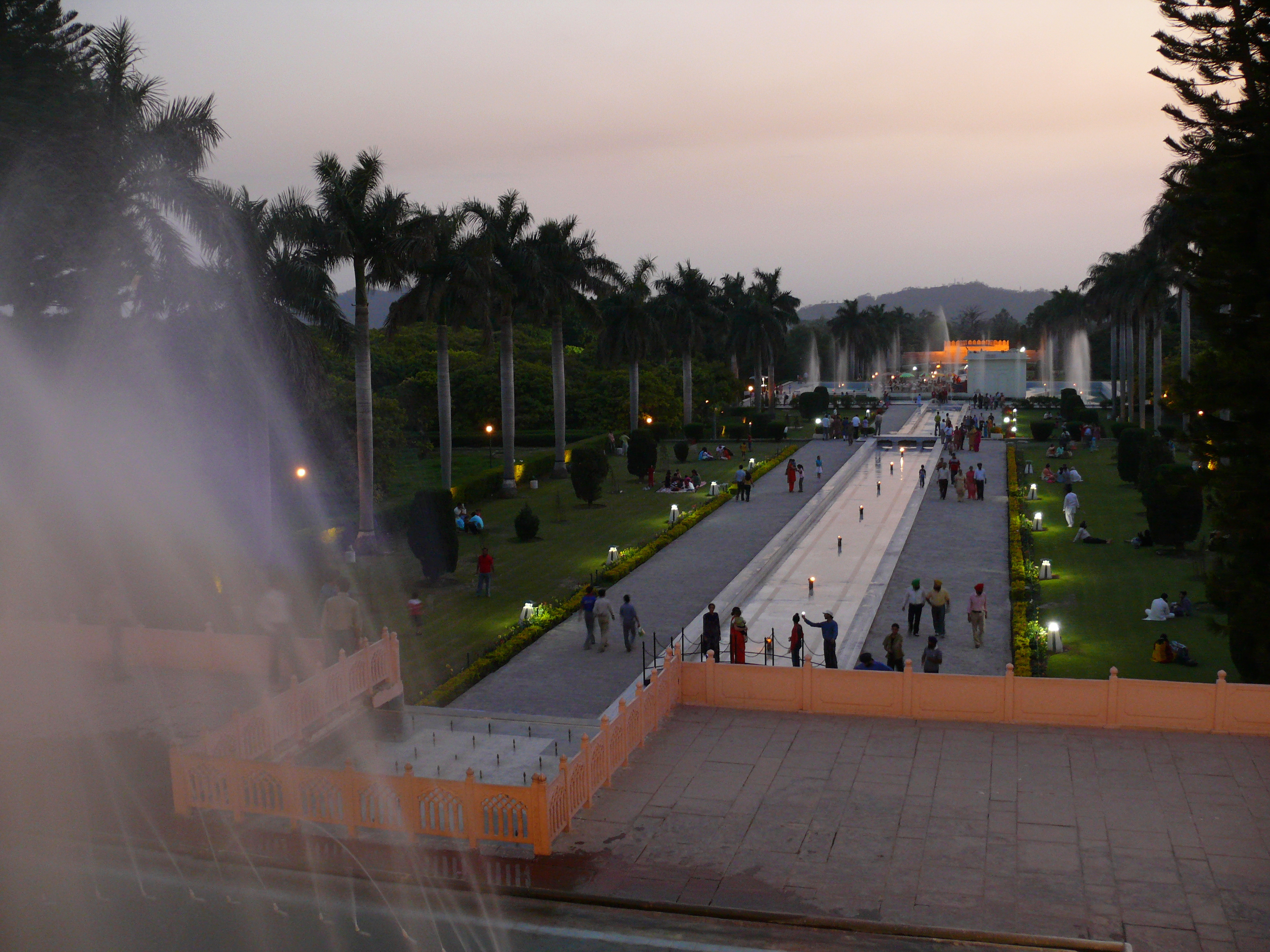
Pinjore Gardens chaharbagh, one of the Mughal Gardens, in Haryana

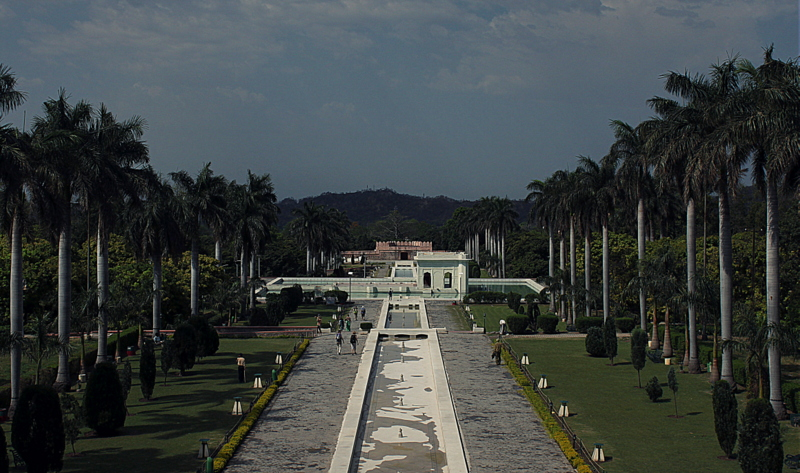
Paradise Garden in Pinjore

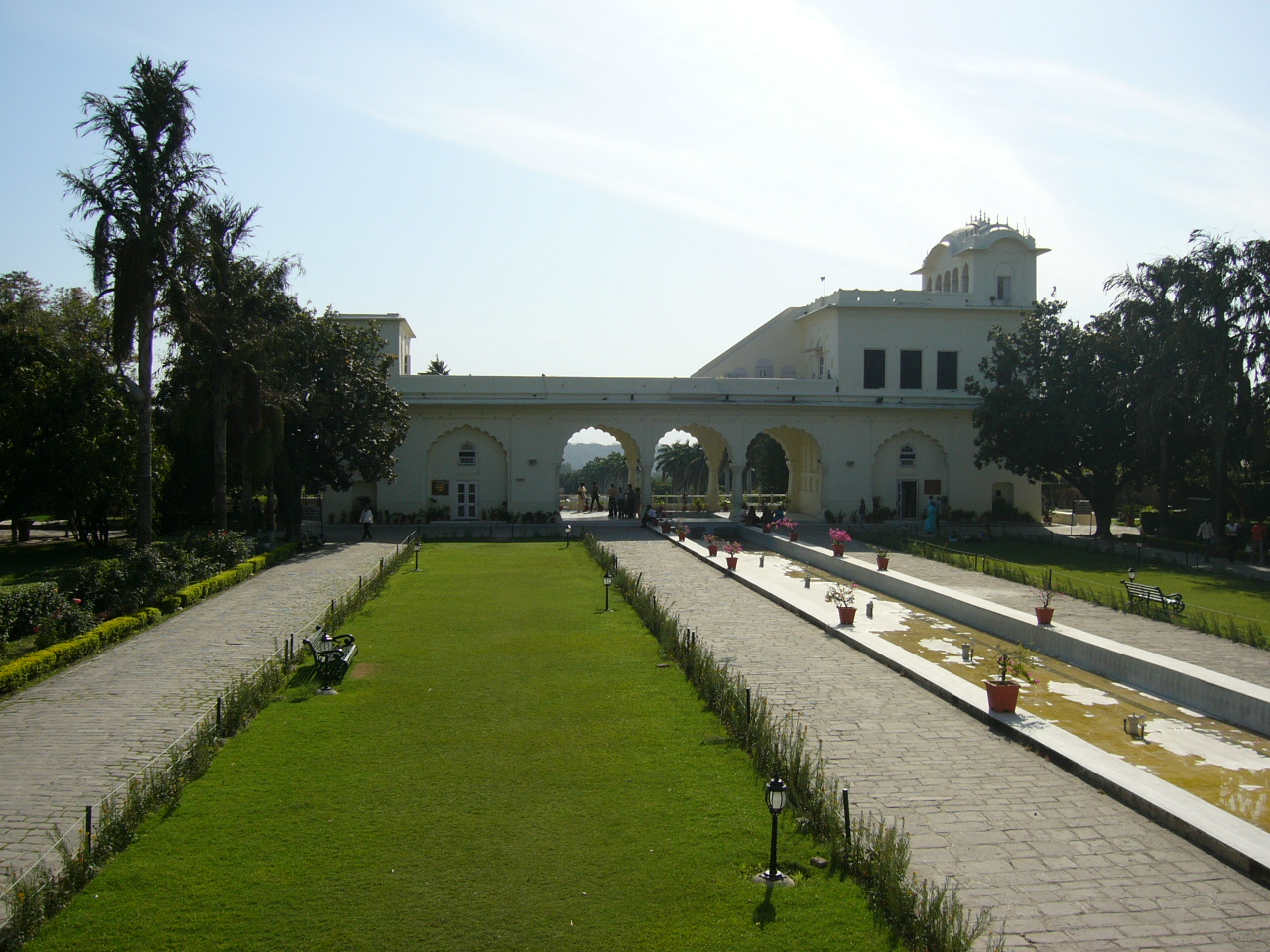
The garden's Mughlai Pavilion

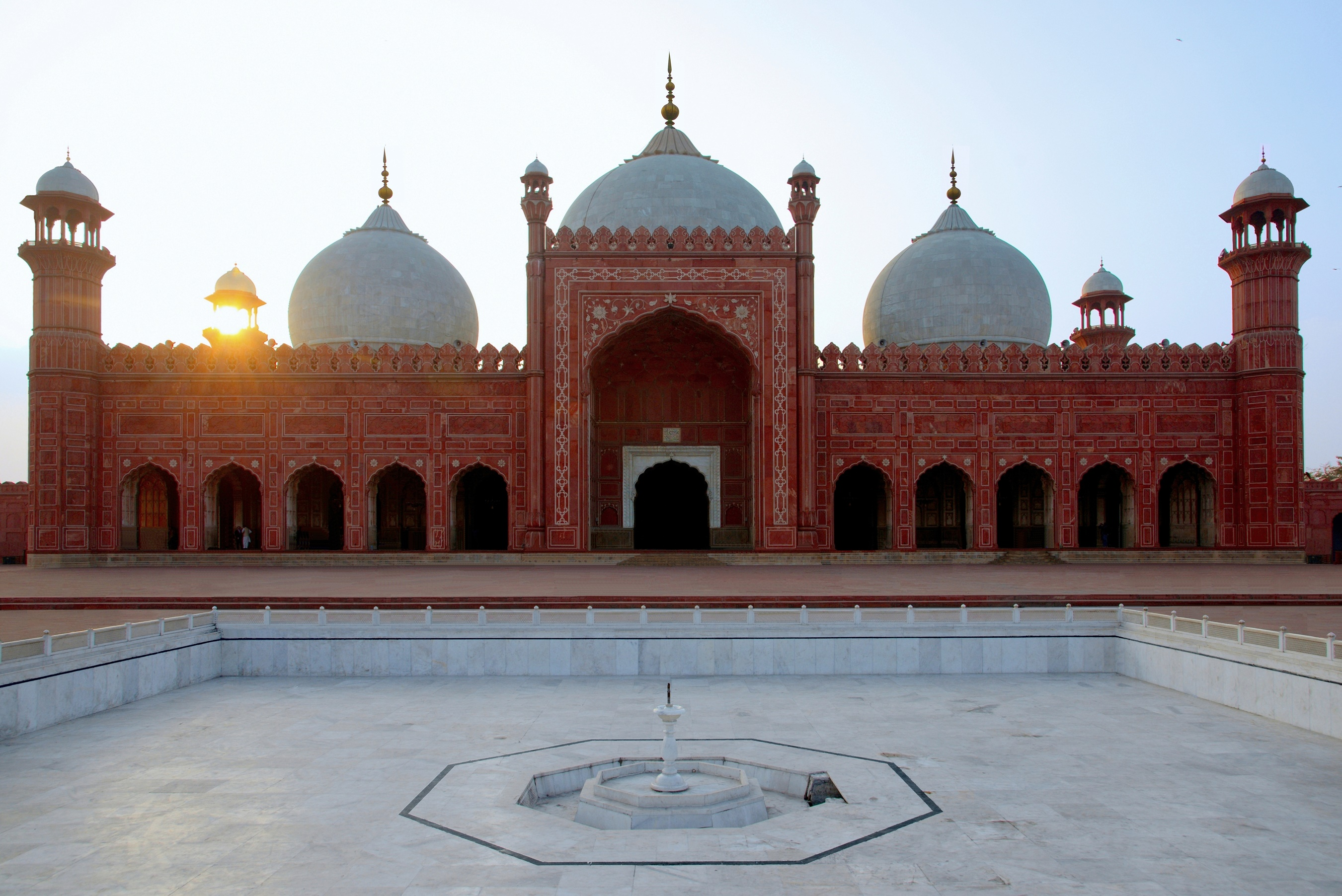
Badshahi Mosque of Lahore built by Fidai Khan Koka

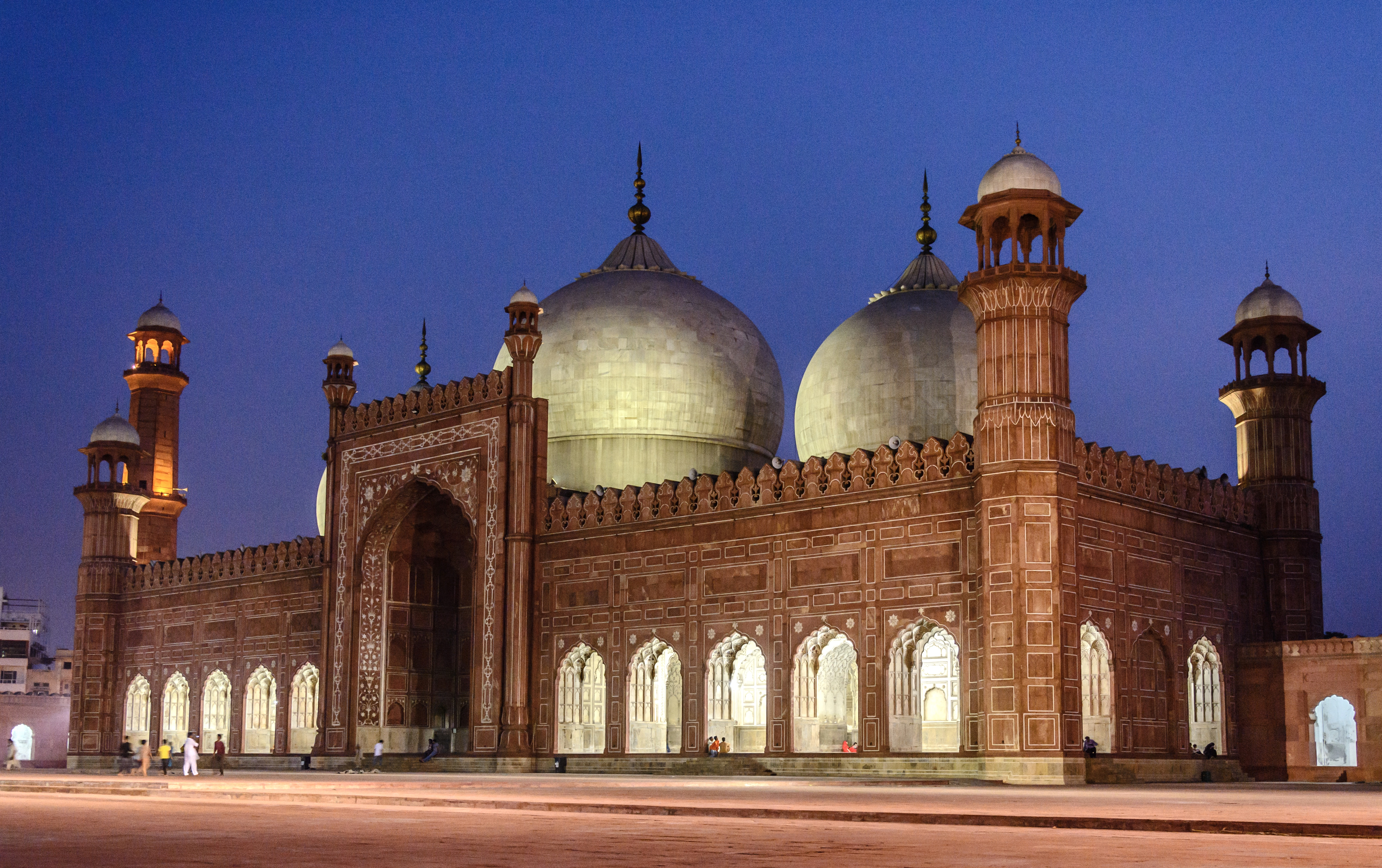
A night view of the Badshahi Mosque of Lahore

== See also ==
- Badshahi Mosque
