= Garhi Sanjar Khan =

Village in Uttar Pradesh, India

- Village
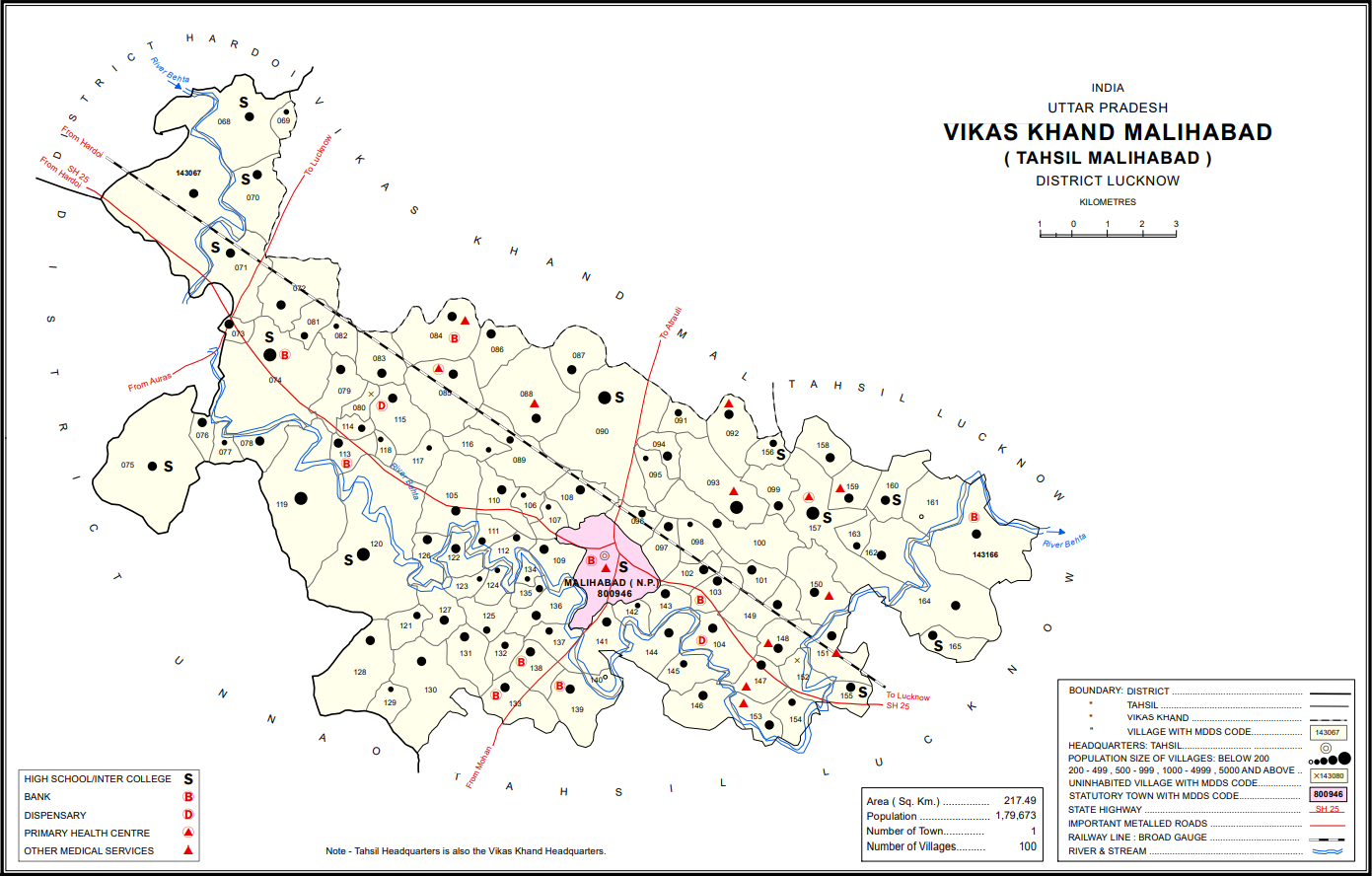
- Map showing Garhi Sanjar Khan (#109) in Malihabad CD block

- Location in Uttar Pradesh, India Garhi Sanjar Khan (India)
- Country: India
- State: Uttar Pradesh
- District: Lucknow

Area
  - Total: 1.046 km^{2} (0.404 sq mi)

Population (2011)
  - Total: 2,833
  - Density: 2,708/km^{2} (7,015/sq mi)

Languages
  - Official: Hindi
- Time zone: UTC+5:30 (IST)

Garhi Sanjar Khan is a village in Malihabad block of Lucknow district, Uttar Pradesh, India. It is located immediately to the west of Malihabad, and it is surrounded by the Behta river on three sides. Markets are held here twice per week. The main staple foods are wheat and rice. As of 2011, Garhi Sanjar Khan has a population of 2,833 people, in 520 households.

== History ==
Originally called Bulakinagar, Garhi Sanjar Khan was the first site that the Amanzai Pathans came to in the region. Their ancestor, Diwan Muhammad Khan, was originally from Banair, near Peshawar, and had been invited to Hindustan by Darya Khan Lodi. Diwan Muhammad Khan's sons, Kawal Khan and Bahadur Khan, were then followers of Darya Khan's sons, Diler Khan (governor of Awadh) and Bahadur Khan (governor of Kabul). The brothers Kawal and Bahadur came to Bulakinagar in 1656; Bahadur's son Sarmast Khan later left and settled in nearby Bakhtiyarnagar, while Kawal Khan's son Sanjar Khan remained in Bulakinagar and gave the village its present name of Garhi Sanjar Khan. Sanjar Khan's descendants remained the zamindars of the village into the 20th century.

The 1961 census recorded Garhi Sanjar Khan as comprising 3 hamlets, with a total population of 1,340 (706 male and 634 female), in 267 households and 226 physical houses. The area of the village was given as 259 acres.

The 1981 census recorded Garhi Sanjar Khan as having a population of 1,951 people, in 331 households, and covering an area of 104.82 hectares.
