= Dularmau =

Village in Uttar Pradesh, India

Dularmau Dulārmau
- Village
- Location in Uttar Pradesh, India Dularmau (India)
- Coordinates: 26.7927°N 81.06098°E
- Country: India
- State: Uttar Pradesh
- District: Lucknow

Area
  - Total: 2.605 km^{2} (1.006 sq mi)
- Elevation: 118 m (387 ft)

Population (2011)
  - Total: 997
  - Density: 383/km^{2} (991/sq mi)

Languages
  - Official: Hindi
- Time zone: UTC+5:30 (IST)

Dularmau, also written as Dular Mau, is a village in Gosainganj block of Lucknow district, Uttar Pradesh, India. As of 2011, its population is 997, in 200 households. It is the seat of a gram panchayat, which also includes the village of Dhakawa.
