= Amrapali (mango) =

Mango cultivar

Mangifera 'Amrapali'
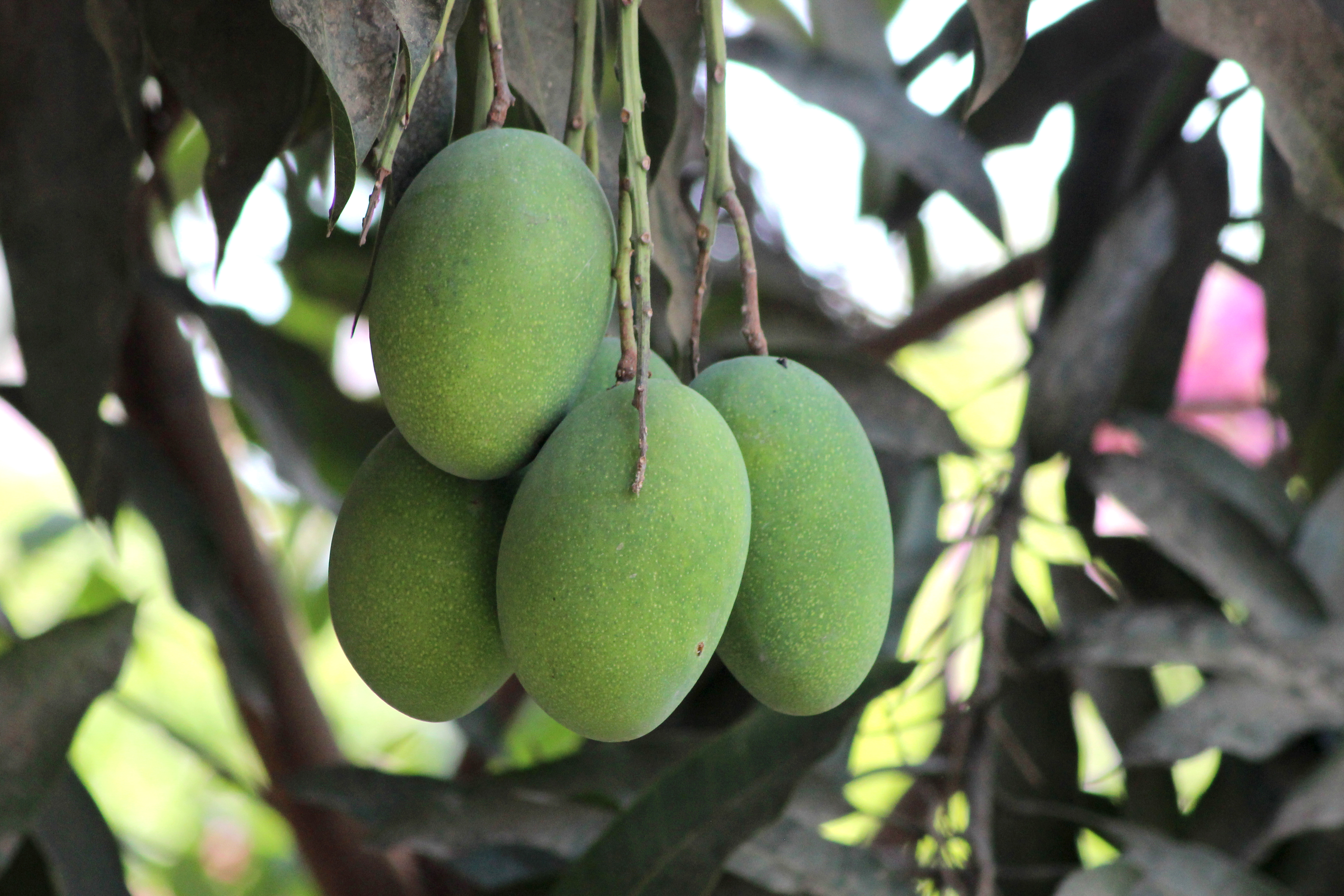
- Genus: Mangifera
- Species: Mangifera indica
- Hybrid parentage: 'Dasheri' × 'Neelum'
- Cultivar: 'Amrapali'
- Origin: India, 1971

The 'Amrapali' mango is a named mango cultivar introduced in 1971. It was developed as a hybrid variety of 'Dasheri' and 'Neelum' by Dr. Pijush Kanti Majumdar at the Indian Agriculture Research Institute in Delhi. Since then this mango has been introduced to farms and orchards across India. Amrapali Mango was first planted in West Bengal in Chakdaha, Nadia district. The seed was given by Dr. Pijush Kanti Majumdar.

== Characteristics ==
The tree is a dwarf, regular-bearer, with clusters of small-sized fruits. Its flesh is a deep orange-red and contains approximately 2.5–3.0 times more β carotene content than other commercial varieties of mango. However, it is known to have a shorter shelf life. The average yield is 16 tonnes / hectare.
