= Langra =

Mango cultivar

Mangifera 'Langra'
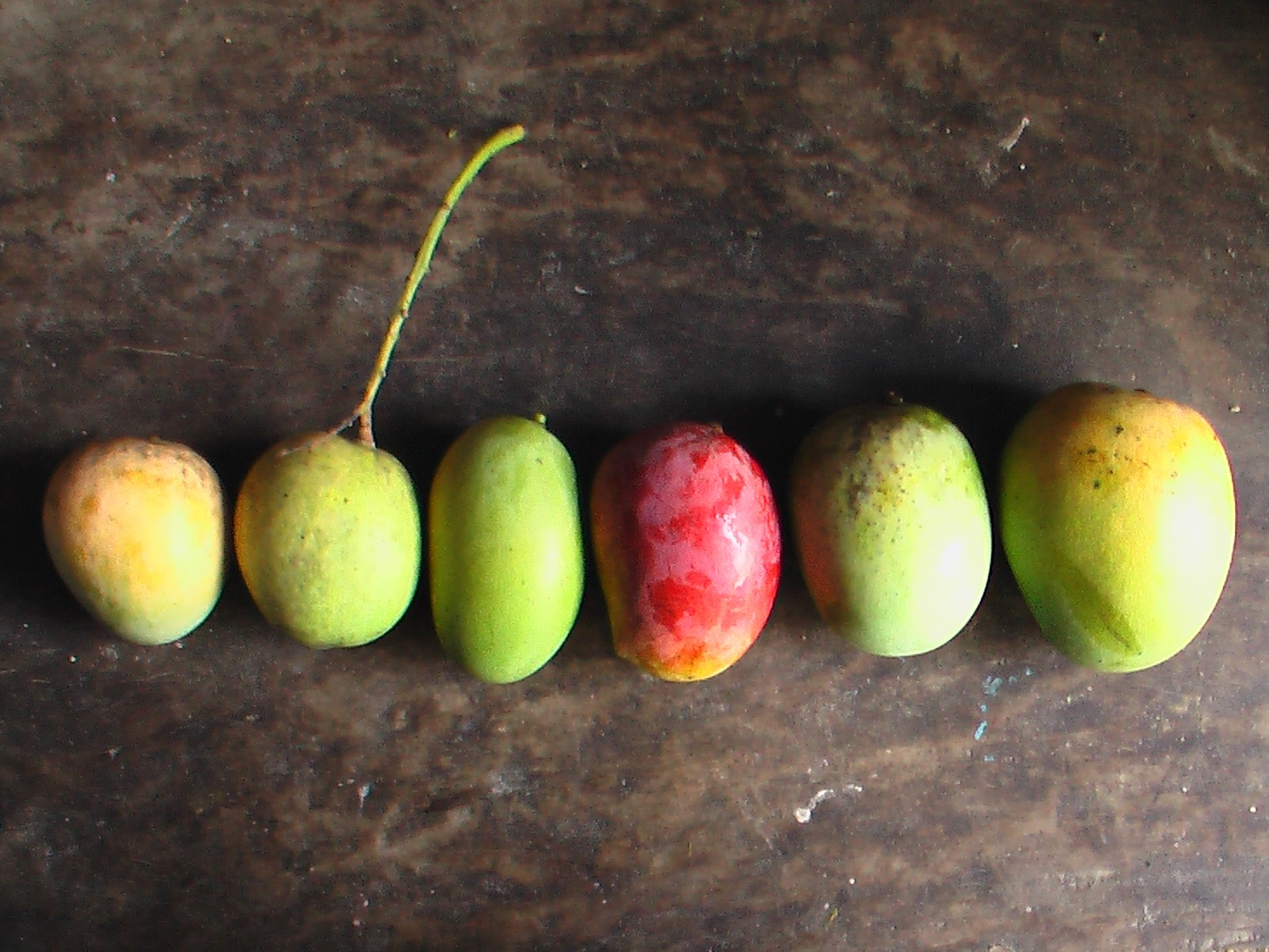
- 'Langra' mangoes at a farm in Mathurapur, Bihar, India
- Genus: Mangifera
- Cultivar: 'Langra'

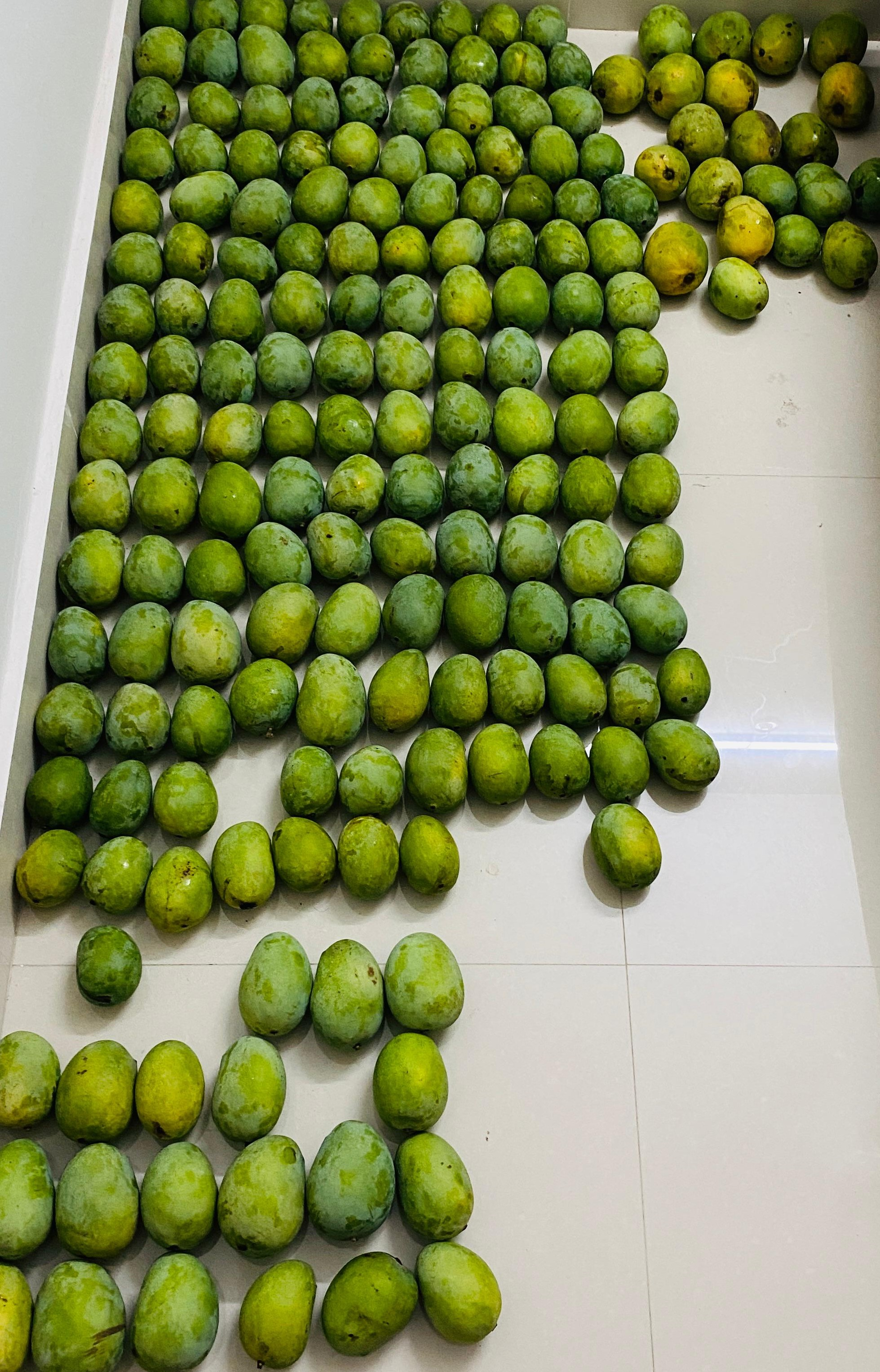
Bhagalpuri Dudhiya Langra - a variant of Langra, whose skin is green in colour, common in Bhagalpur

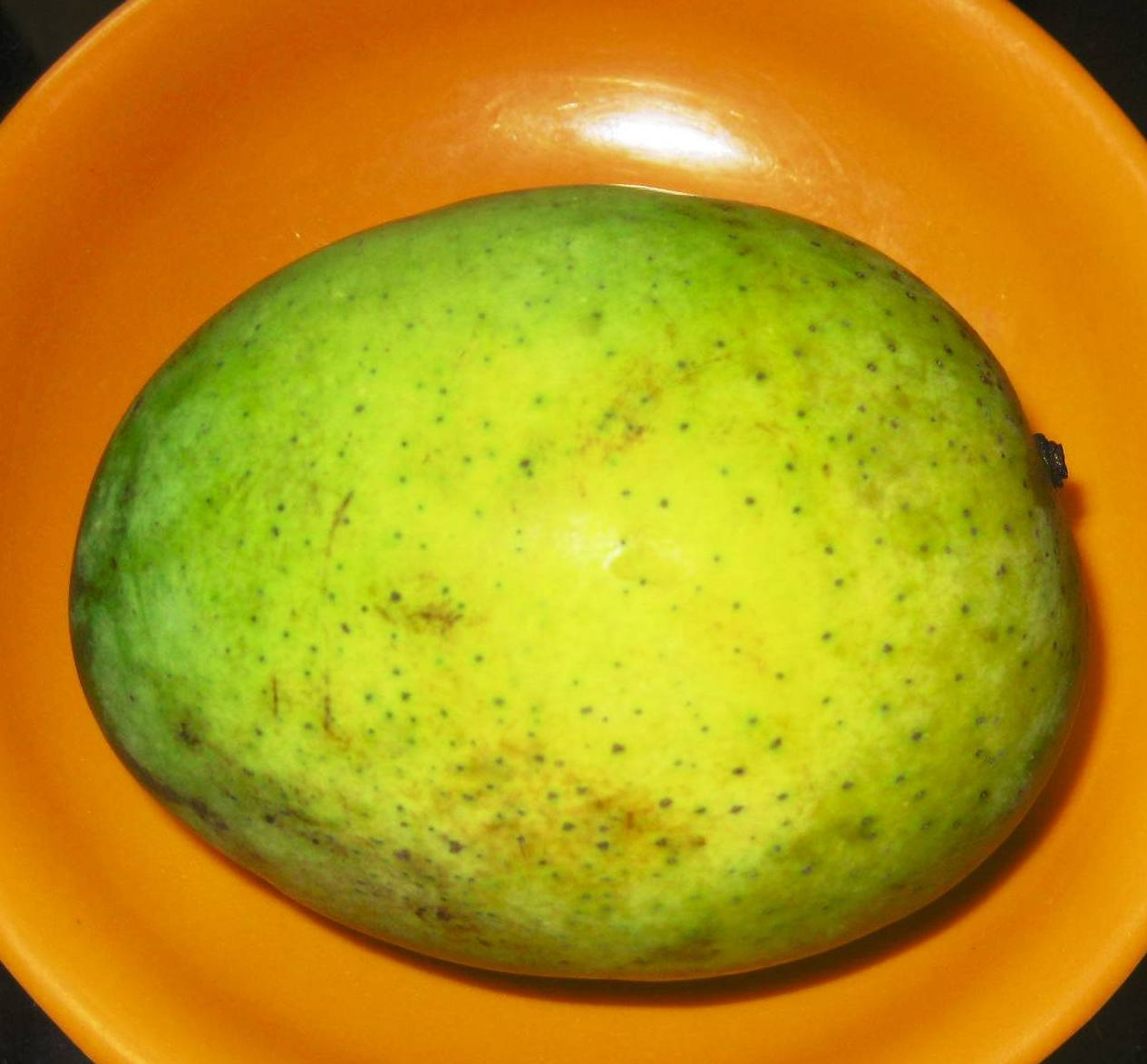
A 'Langra' mango

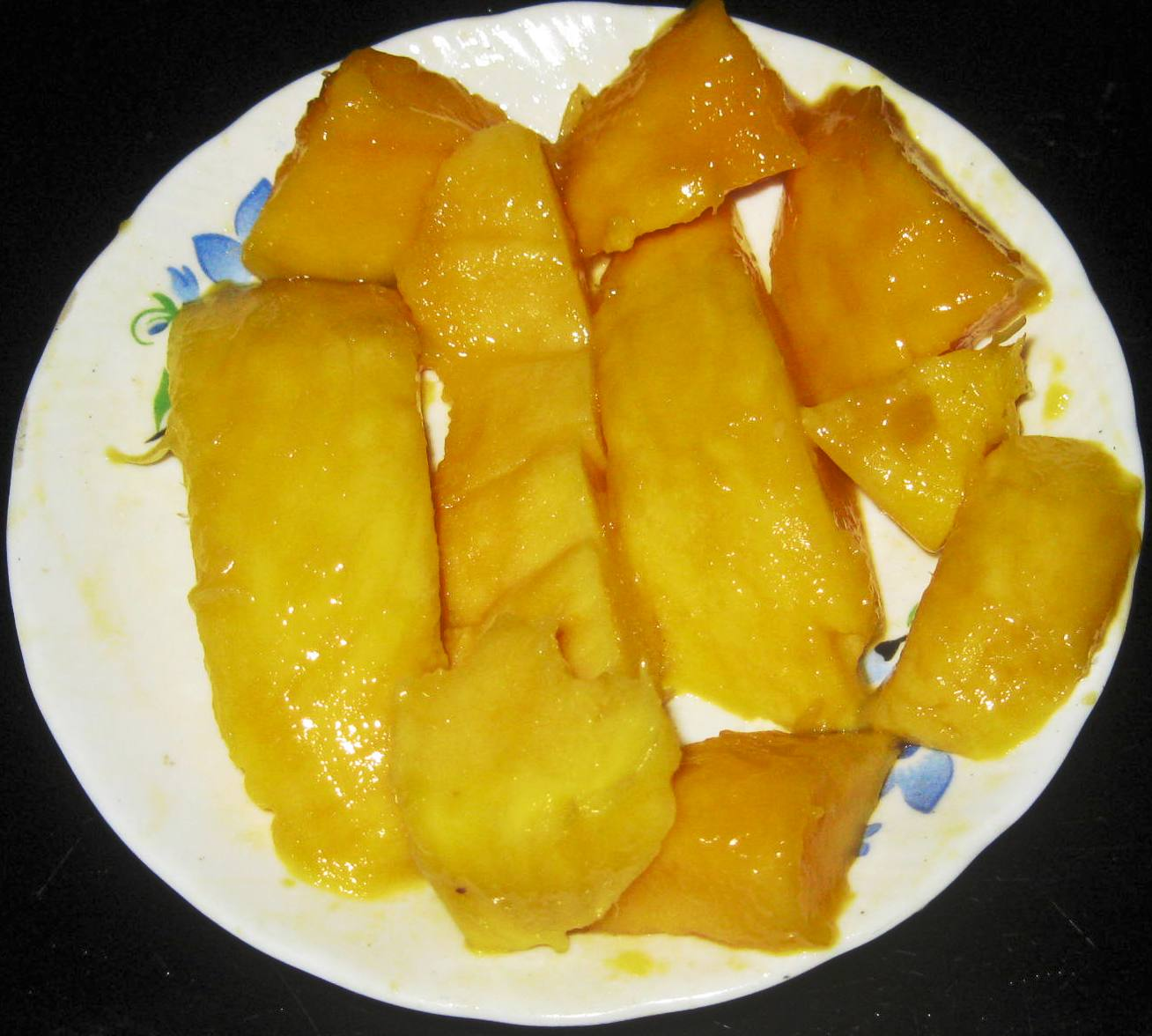
'Langra' mango (sliced)

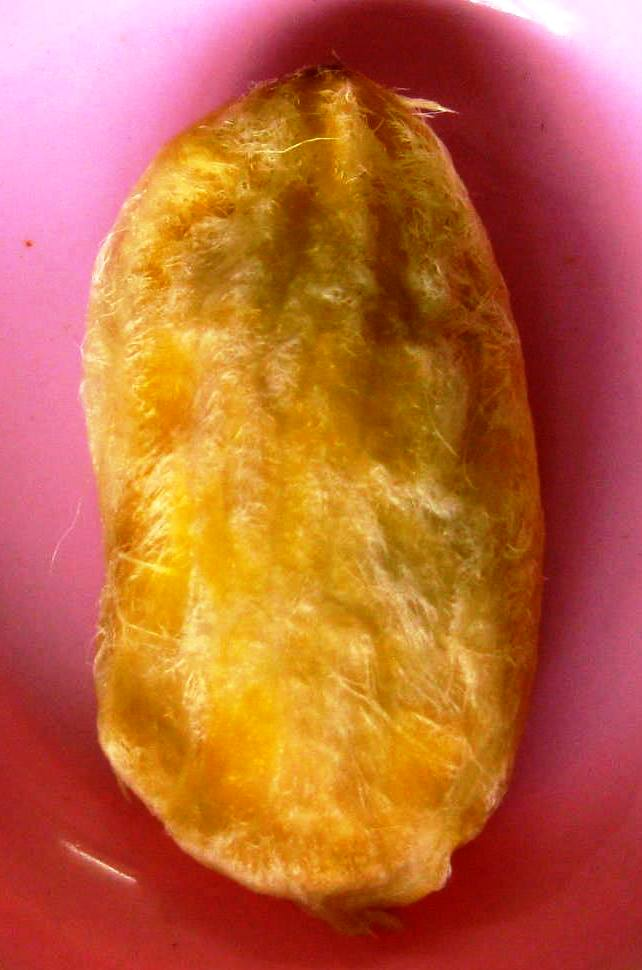
'Langra' mango stone (seed)

The 'Langra' mango, also known as Benarasi Langra, is a mango cultivar that was first cultivated in Banaras in present-day Uttar Pradesh, India 250 to 300 years ago. Apart from Uttar Pradesh, it is also grown in the states of Bihar and West Bengal,

This cultivar retains a greenish tinge while ripening. It is normally harvested during mid-June to last half of July. Around 2006, it was known to be gaining popularity on the international market. It is considered suitable for slicing and canning.

== Variants ==
In Eastern India there is a very sweet variation of the langra mango that is knows as Dudhiya Langra or Bhagalpuri Dudhiya Langra, this variant is green in colour and milk-like in smell, originally grown in Bhagalpur.This mango is not grown outside of Bihar and in other parts of East India but is easily available in markets.

In some part of northern India and in Bihar, there is another variation of the 'Langra' mango is also known as Malda Mango, this variation is orange in colour, less fiber and intense in smell compared to Dudhiya Langra, referring to the Malda village in Bihar and Digha, Patna region in Patna district. Malda mangoes is referred to as the 'king of the mangoes' in North India as well as Eastern India.

One unique quality of Malda mangoes is its rich pulp and small seed whereas Langda is more fibrous than Malda.

== Leaves ==
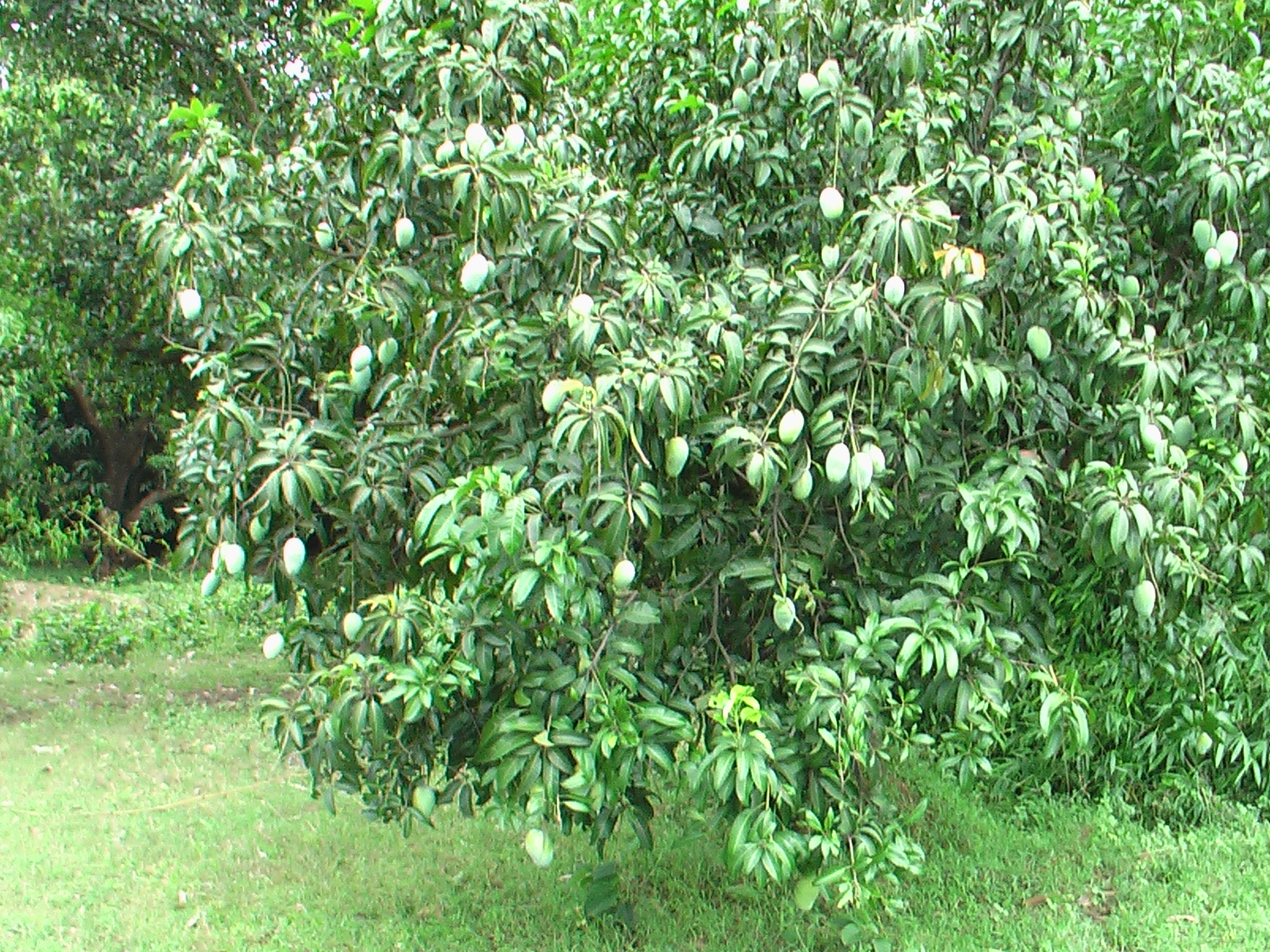
Langra mango tree

The leaf blades have an oval-lanceolate shape and are flat to slightly folded. The apexes are acuminate to sub-acuminate. The secondary veins are arranged as sub-opposite to alternate. They have been measured as follows:

- Length of blade: 21.93 cm
- Length of lamina: 18.95 cm
- Breadth of lamina: 4.75 cm
- Length petioles 2.98 cm
- Length of pulvinus region 1.20 cm
- Length : breadth of lamina: 4.00
- Length of pulvinus : petiole: 0.42
- Length of lamina : petiole: 6.67 cm

== See also ==
- Amrapali
- Himsagar
