= Dasheri =

Mango cultivar

Mangifera 'Dasheri'
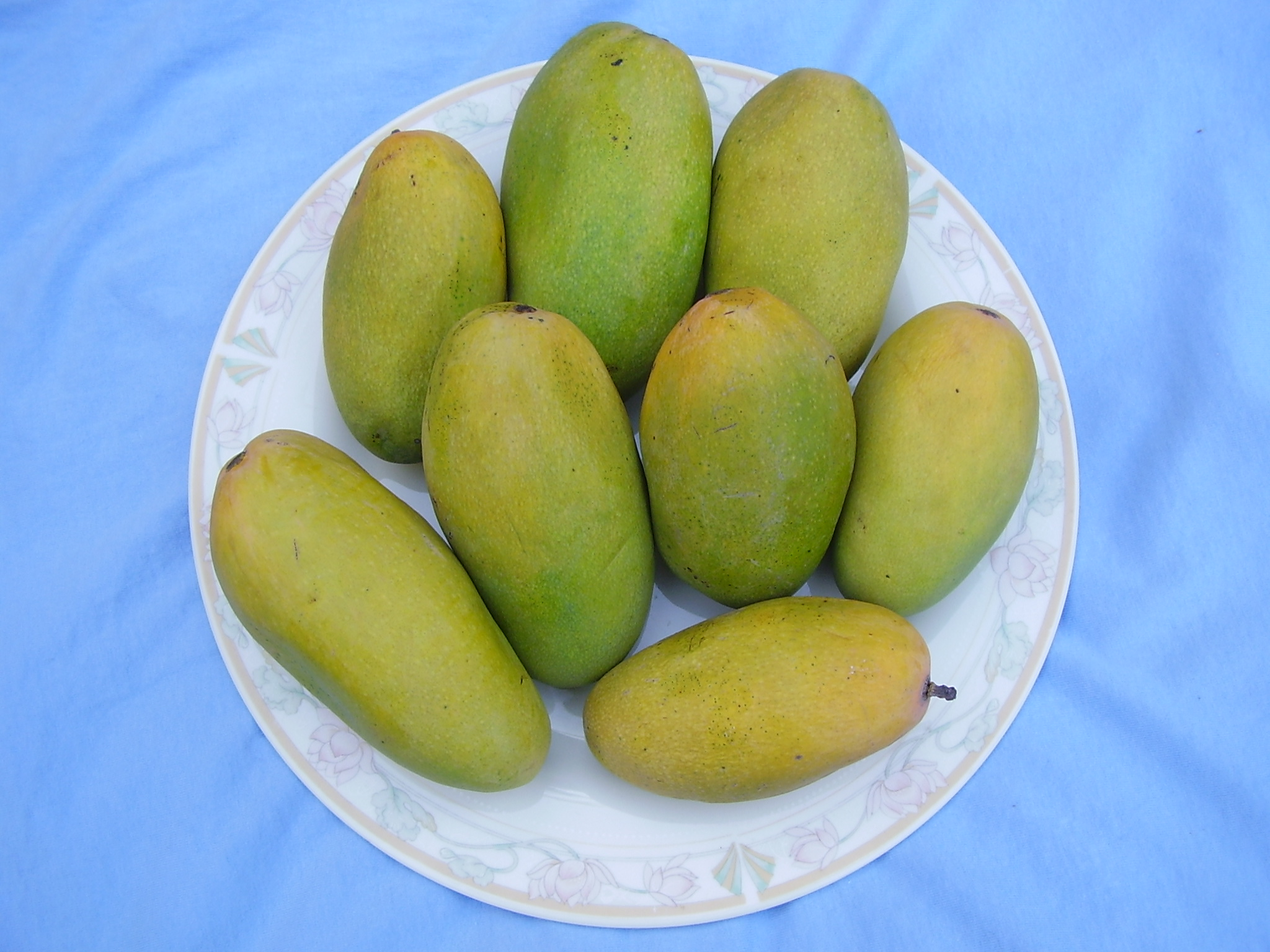
- Genus: Mangifera
- Cultivar: 'Dasheri'
- Origin: India

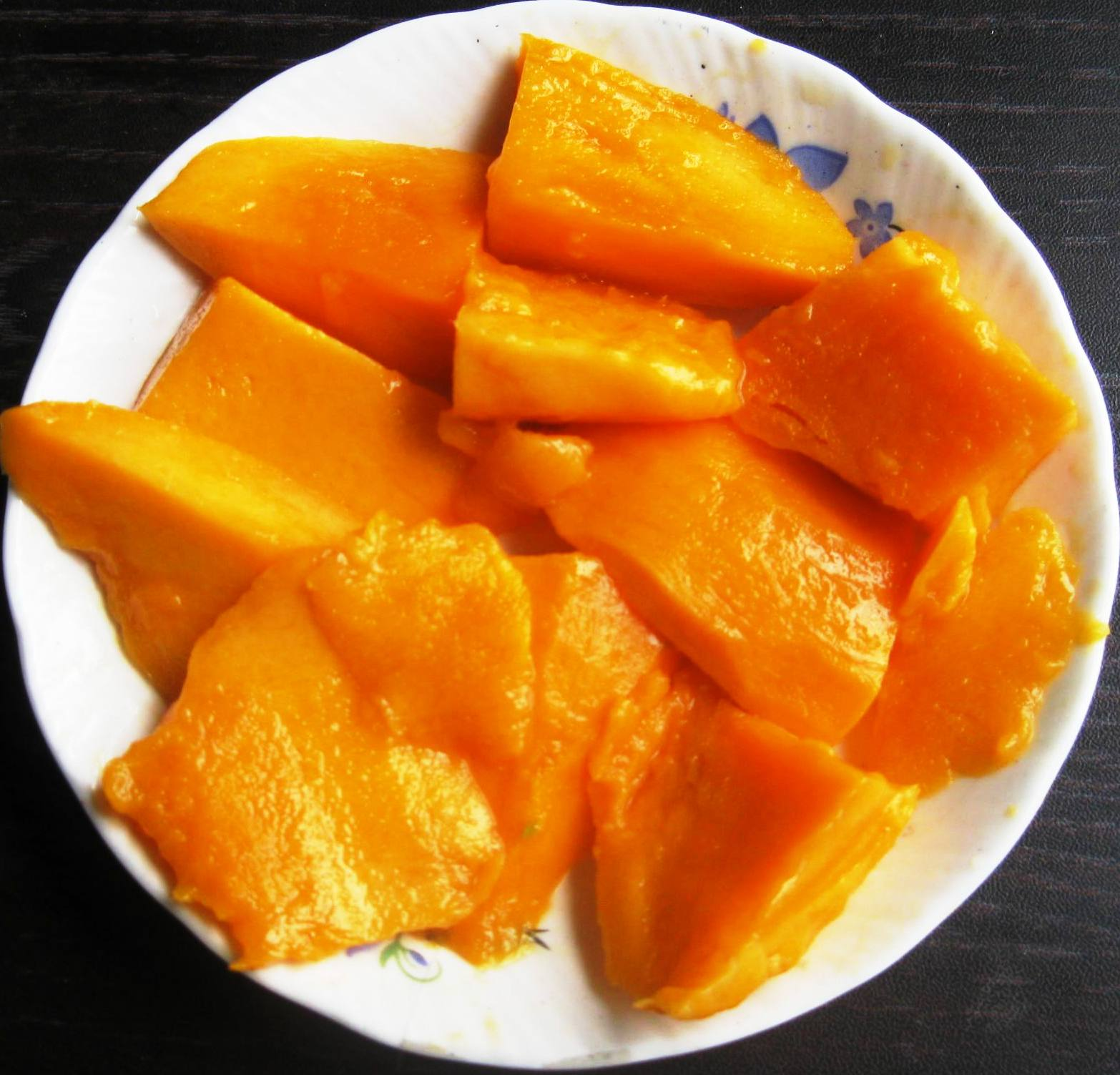
Dasheri mango, sliced

The Dasheri mango is a mango cultivar which originated in a village near Malihabad in Lucknow district and was recognised in the 18th century. It is a sweet and fragrant variety of mango grown in North India, the southern state Andhra Pradesh, Nepal, and Pakistan. Malihabad in Uttar Pradesh is the largest producer.

== History ==
Dasheri mango was originated in the Lucknow district of Uttar Pradesh. The first plant of Dasheri mango, today known as "Mother Dasehri Tree", originated in the Dasehri village, Block Kakori Dist. Lucknow in the Orchard of Nawab Syed Anser Zaidi Sahab. The Mother Dasehri is still in the possession of Nawab Anser's family. This tree is approximately 185 years old and still bears fruits.

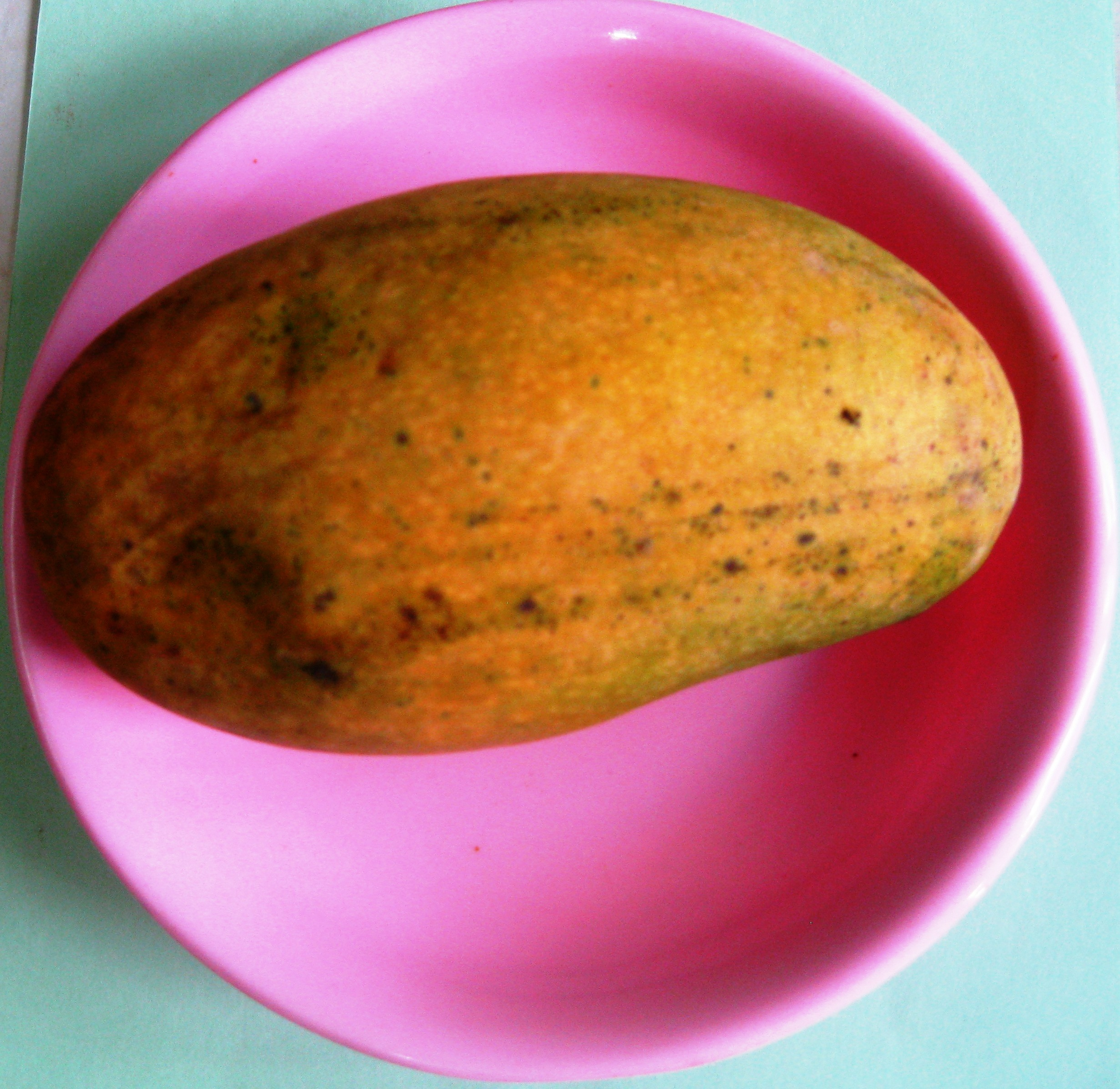
Dasheri mango

== Nutritional benefits ==
Dasheri mangoes are great source of fibre to help with digestion and vitamin C to boost the immune system. The fruits are an excellent source of zinc, vitamin E, iron, calcium, and other quantities of zinc, vitamin A, folate, and other minerals that support proper organ function. Dasheri mangoes include phytochemicals in the skin that may have antioxidant-like qualities to alleviate inflammation in addition to vitamins and minerals.

== Exports ==
The Dasheri mango is exported internationally to various countries including Singapore, Hong Kong, The Philippines, Malaysia, The UAE, Saudi Arabia and other countries in South-East Asia.
