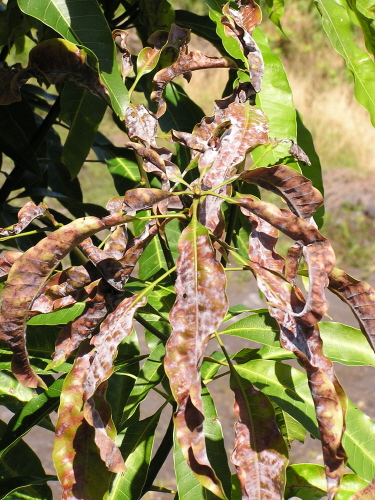
- O. mangiferae infecting mango leaves

Scientific classification
- Kingdom: Fungi
- Division: Ascomycota
- Class: Leotiomycetes
- Order: Helotiales
- Family: Erysiphaceae
- Genus: Oidium
- Species: O. mangiferae

Binomial name
- Oidium mangiferae Berthet, (1914)

Synonyms
- Acrosporium mangiferae (Berthet) Subram., (1971); Oidium erysiphoides f. mangiferae (Berthet) J.M. Yen & Chin C. Wang, (1973)

= Oidium mangiferae =

Species of fungus

Oidium mangiferae is a plant pathogen that infects mango trees causing powdery mildew. Powdery mildew of mango is an Ascomycete pathogen of the Erysiphales family that was initially described by Berthet in 1914, using samples collected from Brazil. O. mangiferae is found in all areas where mangoes have been raised long term, but is particularly widespread in India where both the host and the pathogen are native. Currently no teleomorph stage has been identified, but due to certain morphological characteristics it has been suggested that O. mangiferae belongs in the Erysiphe polygony group. Mango is the only known host for this pathogen, though O. mangiferae appears to be identical to fungi responsible for powdery mildew diseases on various other plant species, particularly oak, though some differences may be observed. In particular, the number of cells in conidiophores varies from 2 on mango to 3-5 on oak. O. mangiferae has been known to infect oak leaves in the laboratory, however due to the lack of a known teleomorph stage O. mangiferae is still considered to only be a pathogen of mango. Recent analysis of its ribosomal DNA suggests it is conspecific with Erysiphe alphitoides, the causative agent of powdery mildew in European oaks.

== Host ==
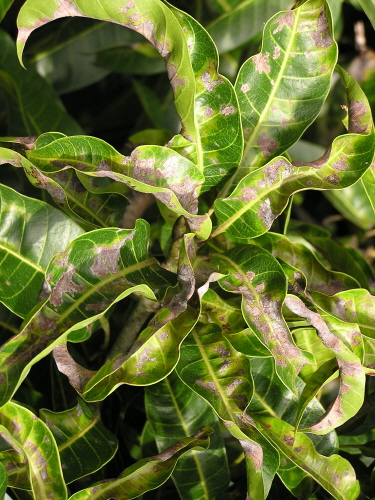
O. mangiferae leaf spots and leaf curling on mango leaves

Mangoes are a commercial fruit crop of the cashew family (Anacardiaceae) which are an important crop in many countries including India, China, Pakistan, Mexico and Thailand. There are many species of mango, but the only one raised for commercial fruit production is Mangifera indica, as the fruit it bears is the most appealing and edible. Originally cultivated in India beginning more than 5,000 years ago, mangoes currently represent up to 50% of international fruit production. Mangoes are susceptible to a large variety of pathogens, including root rot, anthracnose, die back, and leaf spot, among others. However, one of the most prevalent and damaging diseases of this crop is powdery mildew of mango, caused by Oidium mangiferae; crop losses between 20 and 90 percent have been reported from various regions due to powdery mildew infections. Most mango cultivars in use today were released from 1949–1967, with continuous cultivation since that time. Long term cultivation may affect disease resistance, and very little breeding for resistant varieties has been undertaken; due to this, almost all cultivars show susceptibility to O. mangiferae and it is extremely widespread. The most popular variety of mango, the Tommy Atkins, was developed in the 1920s in Florida and is favored because of its long shelf life and anthracnose resistance, though it is still somewhat susceptible to powdery mildew and control strategies must still be enacted. Diseases of perennial crops such as mango are devastating due to the long time period to maturity for the plants, as a tree grown from seed will not produce fruit until it has reached three to six years of age. In contrast, the mango tree may live and produce fruit for several hundred years if it remains healthy and is well cared for. In addition, perennial crops can allow for buildup of inoculum and widespread dispersal of pathogens such as powdery mildew because the host is present in all seasons and through multiple years.

== Disease ==
Oidium mangiferae appears in spring, from December through March, and primary inoculum comes either from wind borne conidia from other infection sites, or from surviving inoculum and mycelia on the tree. Powdery mildew is most prevalent in cool, dry years, and secondary infections also occur from wind dispersed conidia. The disease is highly polycyclic, with the pathogen life cycle from germination to conidiation taking only 9 days, and conidia infecting the plant tissues 5–7 hours after germination. Warm temperatures with cloud cover and heavy dew promote infection, though dry conditions favor disease development. The fungus overwinters in infected leaves and malformed inflorescences in the form of dormant mycelium, conidiophores or conidia. This fungus is ectophytic, existing primarily on the surface of plant tissues. It draws nutrients from the plant via haustoria that penetrate the epidermal layer. This pathogen is also biotrophic, surviving only on live plant tissues. As such, growth of the pathogen ceases when the tissue it occupies becomes necrotic. Conidia germinate between 9 and 30.5 degrees Celsius, with an optimal temperature of 22 degrees. Atmospheric temperatures of 10-31 degrees Celsius are the optimum for development of the disease on mango trees. Disease development is inversely proportional to the number of hours of sunshine per day, and moderate to high relative humidity also plays a role in the severity of infections. Powdery mildew infections show a characteristic white or gray powdery growth on various plant surfaces, including leaves, flower scales, buds, axils, stalks, and fruits. If the white outer growth is removed or disturbed, the disease appears as purple-brown blotches on older leaves and fruit. Infection may also cause distortion of young leaves, as the infection usually begins on the underside of the leaf. Necrotic lesions appear on the upper side of the leaf, and the leaves tend to curl downward. The disease is often of most concern and causes the most damage when it is present on flowers, inflorescences and fruit. When infections occur, Oidium mangiferae may cause premature shedding of flowers and fruit, often before fruits reach the size of peas or prior to flower fertilization. This causes a severe decline in fruit yield and crop commercial return. Blossoms are most susceptible to infection at the point that flowers are just beginning to open on the panicles. Infected fruits turn a yellow color and may become misshapen. The conidia produce germ tubes, which develop into hook-like appressoria that are used for cuticle penetration. Penetration pegs develop into tubular haustoria, which later swell and become globular. O. mangiferae produces septate, hyaline conidia that range from barrel shaped to elliptical. Germ tube length is dependent on relative humidity, and hyphal cells are 40-80 μm long.

== Control ==
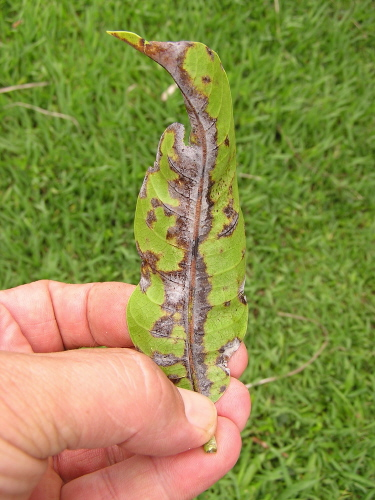
A close up of an infected mango leaf

As with most pathogens of plants, there are three main methods of preventing or controlling infection of mango by powdery mildew: exclusion, evasion, and eradication.

=== Exclusion ===
The conditions conducive to the growth of powdery mildew on mango are consistent enough that predictions can be made as to when to apply fungicides to protect the crop. These predictions are based mainly on mean daily temperature and rainfall, and have been used to create a simple program that indicates when spraying is necessary. The most commonly used means of control of Oidium mangiferae is the use of sulfur and copper fungicides, particularly copper sulfate and elemental sulfur. Bordeaux mixture, when applied prior to flowering, has also been shown to have a preventative effect. Sulfur fungicides are applied by dusting onto the plant, with an application rate of 1-3 lbs of fungicide per tree. The sulfur is applied shortly after flowering, followed by two more applications at 15-day intervals. Fungicides are most effective if applied when the flowers are at 30-40% blooming, or when the first conidia are trapped in the vicinity of the trees. Other fungicides that have shown some potential for disease control on the mango, including Baycor, Calixin, and Bayleton among others. These fungicides require four applications at 10- to 14-day intervals, beginning at the first appearance of the disease, and produce a significantly reduced percent disease index and percent leaves infected in comparison to untreated plants. Benzimidazole fungicides are also known to be effective, though these have been out of production for several years. Since mangoes are a perennial crop and therefore the farmers that raise them are obligated to produce the same product from one year to the next despite any economic and production changes, fungicide applications may vary from year to year. In certain years and conditions, it may not be financially feasible or reasonable to perform pathogen control to the same extent as it was previously. Because of this, it is in the growers' better interests to invest in crops that have natural resistance to pathogens so that fungicide requirements will be minimized. Though fungicides appear to be effective in preventing and controlling this disease, a variety of management strategies have also been proposed to prevent powdery mildew spread. In particular, prudent application of irrigation, use of only healthy seeds, seedling and plants for grafting and use of cover crops or mixed cropping in the vicinity of the mango orchard to remove other possible hosts that could harbor disease that may spread to the mango. Sanitation via removal or burning of diseased plants and proper use of fungicides and fertilizers are also promoted for disease control.

=== Eradication ===
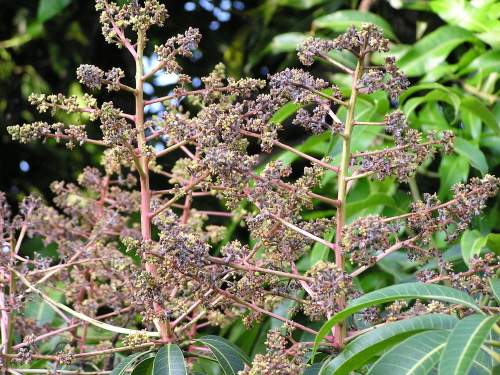
Developing flowers infected by O. mangiferae

Bacillus licheniformis strain SB3086 has been identified as a biological control agent of mango anthracnose infection, and also shows some antagonistic effects toward powdery mildew infections when applied in combination with copper oxychloride. One current issue with the use of B. licheniformis as a control agent is that no reliable means has been developed for maintaining the bacterial population over the long term. The other major issue with the use of this species as a biopesticide is that it has been potentially identified as causing illnesses such as food poisoning in humans, as well as several other diseases in animals. It is currently approved in the United States by the Environmental Protection Agency for use in controlling fungal diseases on ornamental plants and turf, but cannot be applied to any crop intended for consumption by animals or humans. Ampelomyces quisqualis is another biological control agent, this being a fungus that is capable of parasitizing O. mangiferae. It was registered with the EPA as a biopesticide in 1994, used for powdery mildew control on various fruit, vegetable and ornamental crops. It has been deemed safe for use on crops intended for human and animal consumption, with no adverse side effects anticipated. It is marketed with the trade name “AQ10”, and is available in powder format. Several varieties of A. quisqualis that are resistant to commonly used fungicides are also available, so that regular fungicide applications may also be used in combination with the biopesticide. Pycnidia are produced within the mycelia and conidiophores of the powdery mildew, leading to reduced growth or colony death. The limitation of this parasite as a biocontrol agent is that it requires that some of the pathogen be present to act as a host for its growth. In plant species and cultivars with little or no powdery mildew resistance, the small amount of pathogen growth may cause an unacceptable amount of damage before A. quisqualis can control the fungus.

=== Evasion ===
To prevent hypervirulent strains from arising and spreading rapidly due to monoculture, cultivar mixtures are commonly employed in mango plantations. However, the usefulness of cultivar mixtures may be limited in this regard due to the size of the mango tree host, where autoinfection with the pathogen is extremely likely. In addition, rotation of or alternation of fungicides applied to the crop is suggested in order to prevent resistance from developing. Resistant varieties of mango, such as Tommy Atkins, will still produce fruit following infection. However, yield is still affected as the fruit produced tends to be smaller, and peduncles tend to be thicker. Non-resistant cultivars will be unable to bear fruit at all if this disease is left untreated. Two mango varieties evaluated as most resistant to powdery mildew are the Rocha and Regina cultivars. Many countries have also enacted quarantine procedures against many mango pathogens, including O. mangiferae, with the intent of preventing the pathogen from spreading to new areas or being introduced into resident crops. Quarantine techniques include washing of fruit, fungicide application prior to import, and exposure to hot water to decontaminate.
