= Mango =

Tropical fruit

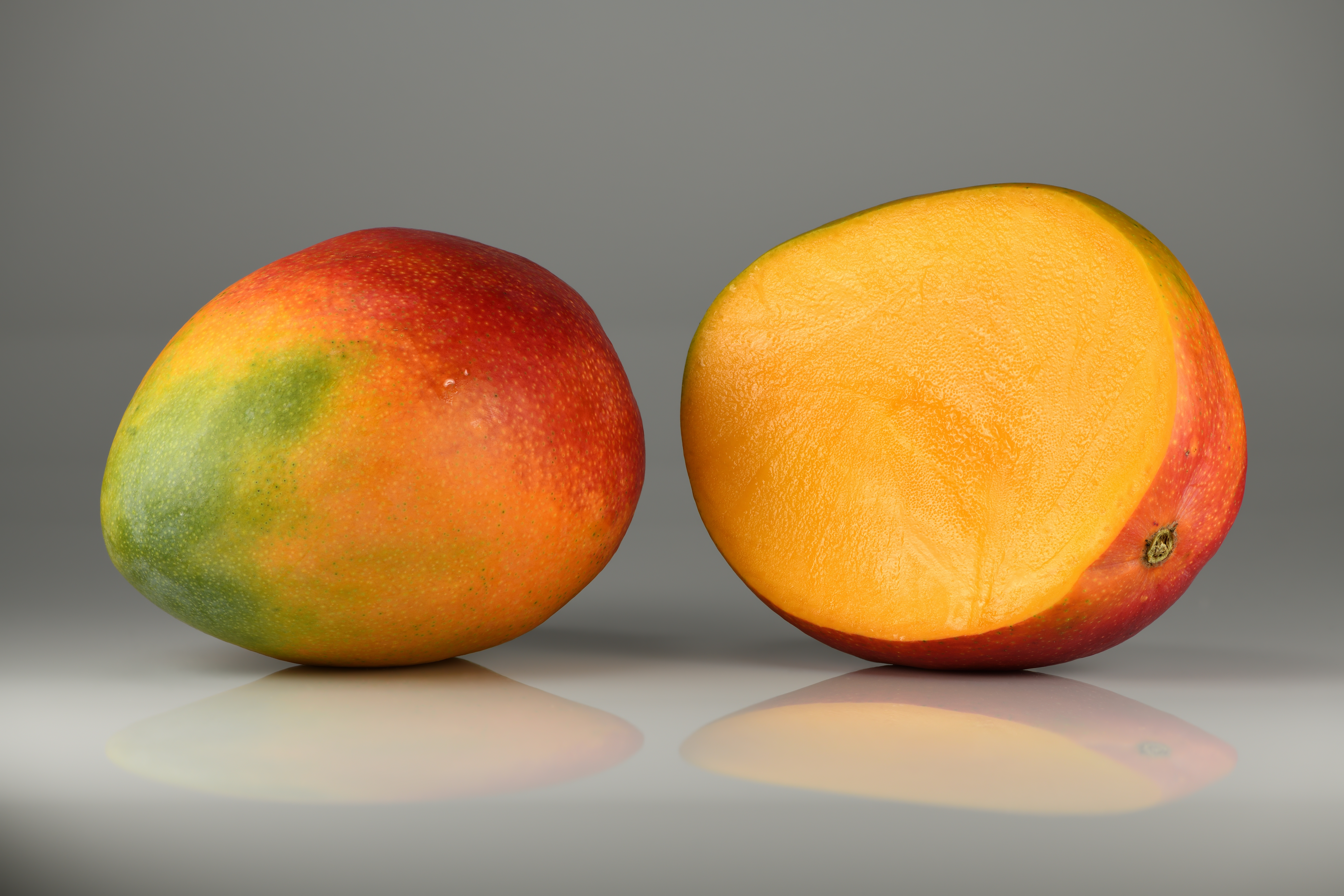
Mango fruit – whole and halved

A mango is an edible stone fruit produced by the tropical tree Mangifera indica. It originated in the area between the northeastern part of the Indian subcontinent and Myanmar. M. indica has been cultivated in South and Southeast Asia since ancient times, resulting in two modern mango cultivar lineages: the "Indian" and the "Southeast Asian" types. Other species in the genus Mangifera also produce edible fruits called "mangoes", most of which are found in the Malesian ecoregion.

There are several hundred cultivars of mango worldwide. Depending on the cultivar, mango fruits vary in size, shape, sweetness, skin colour, and flesh colour, which may be pale yellow, gold, green, or orange. Mango is the national fruit of India, Pakistan, and the Philippines, while the mango tree is the national tree of Bangladesh.

== Etymology ==
The English word mango (plural mangoes or mangos) originated in the 16th century from the Malay word manga, from the Malayalam manga, and ultimately from the Tamil māṉ (மான், 'mango tree') + kāy (காய், 'unripe fruit/vegetable').

== Description ==
Mango trees grow to 30–40 metres (98–131 feet) tall, with a crown radius of 10–15 m (33–49 ft). The trees are long-lived, as some specimens still fruit after 300 years.

In deep soil, the taproot descends to a depth of 6 m (20 ft), with profuse, wide-spreading feeder roots and anchor roots penetrating deeply into the soil. The leaves are evergreen, alternate, simple, 15–35 centimetres (6–14 inches) long, and 6–16 cm (2 1/2–6 1/2 in) broad; when the leaves are young they are orange-pink, rapidly changing to a dark, glossy red, then dark green as they mature.

The flowers are produced in terminal panicles 10–40 cm (4–15 1/2 in) long; each flower is small and white with five petals 5–10 millimetres (3/16–3/8 in) long, with a mild, sweet fragrance.

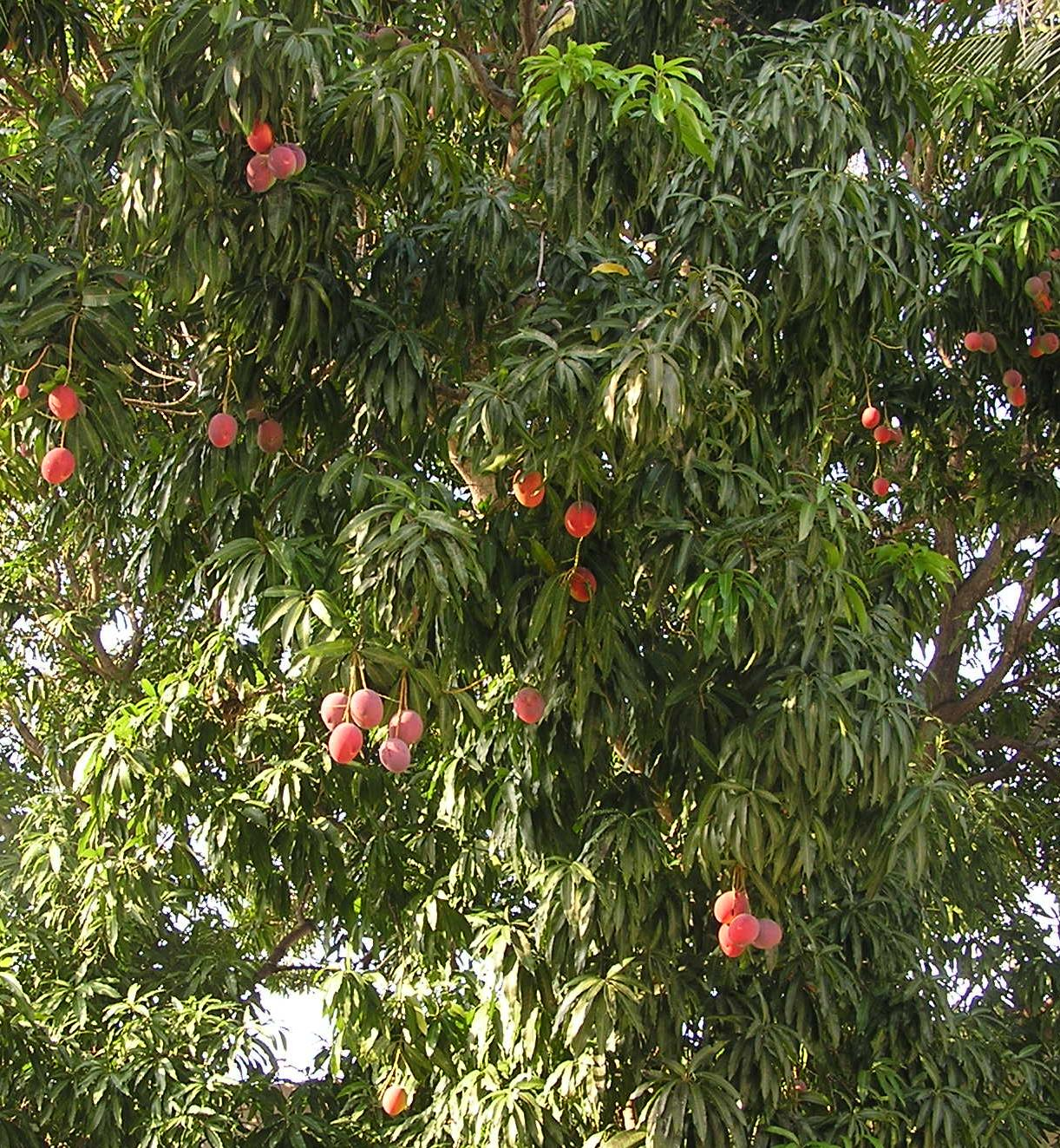
Tree

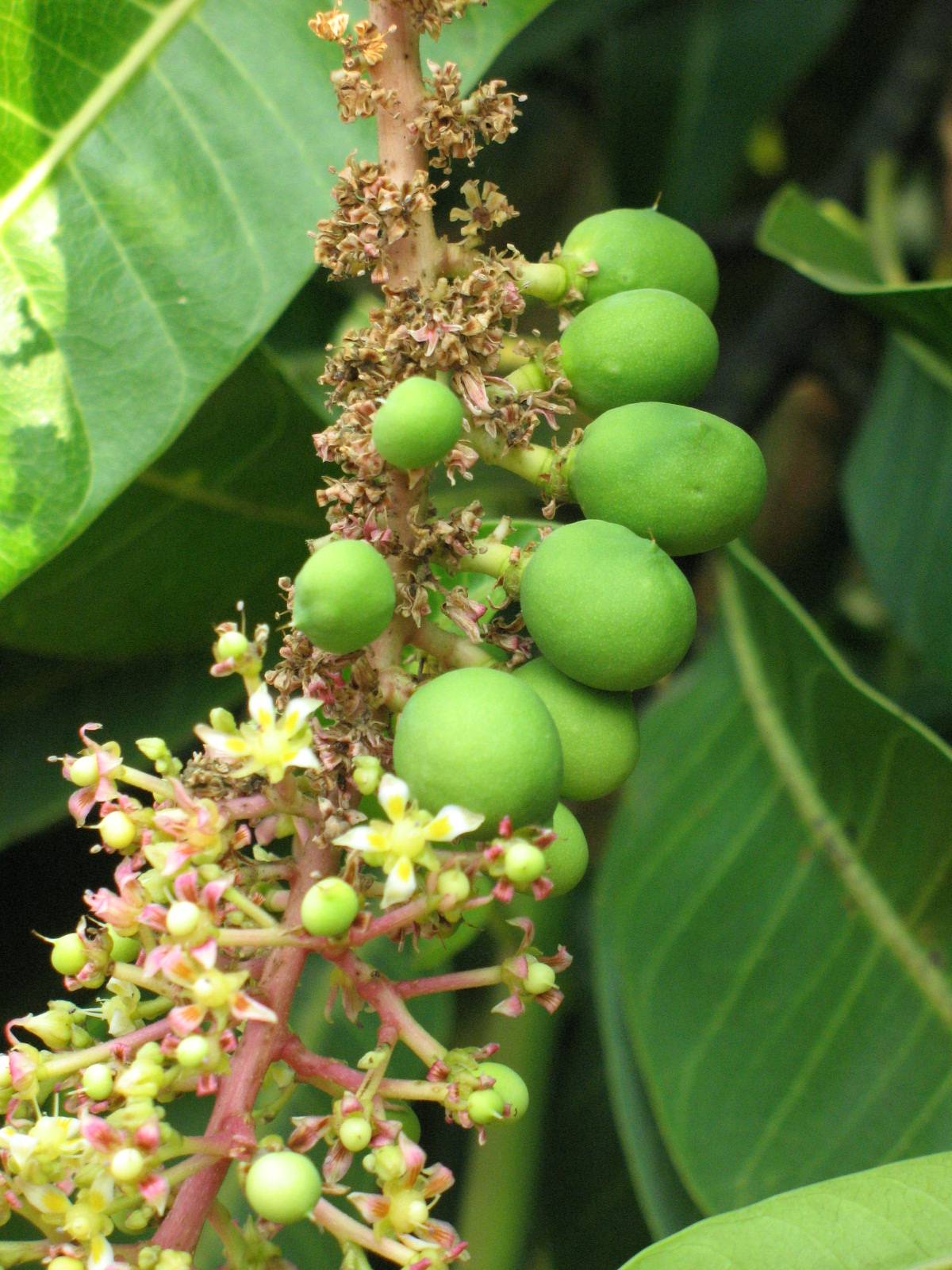
Flowers and immature fruit

=== Fruit ===
The fruit has a single flat, oblong stone that can be fibrous or hairy on the surface and does not separate easily from the pulp. The fruit may be somewhat round, oval, or kidney-shaped, ranging from 5–25 centimetres (2–10 in) in length and from 140 grams (5 oz) to 2 kilograms (5 lb) in weight per individual fruit. The skin is leather-like, waxy, smooth, and fragrant, with colours ranging from green to yellow, yellow-orange, yellow-red, or blushed with various shades of red, purple, pink, or yellow when fully ripe.

The ripe fruits vary according to cultivar in size, shape, colour, sweetness, and eating quality. Depending on the cultivar, the fruit is variously yellow, orange, red, or green. Over 500 cultivars of mango are known, many of which ripen in summer, while some give a double crop. The fruit takes four to five months from flowering to ripening.

Ripe intact mangoes give off a distinctive resinous, sweet smell. Inside the stone with its 1–2 mm (0.039–0.079 in) thick woody endocarp is a single seed, 4–7 cm (1.6–2.8 in) long. Mangoes have recalcitrant seeds which do not survive freezing and drying. Mango trees grow readily from seeds, with germination success highest when seeds are obtained from mature fruit.

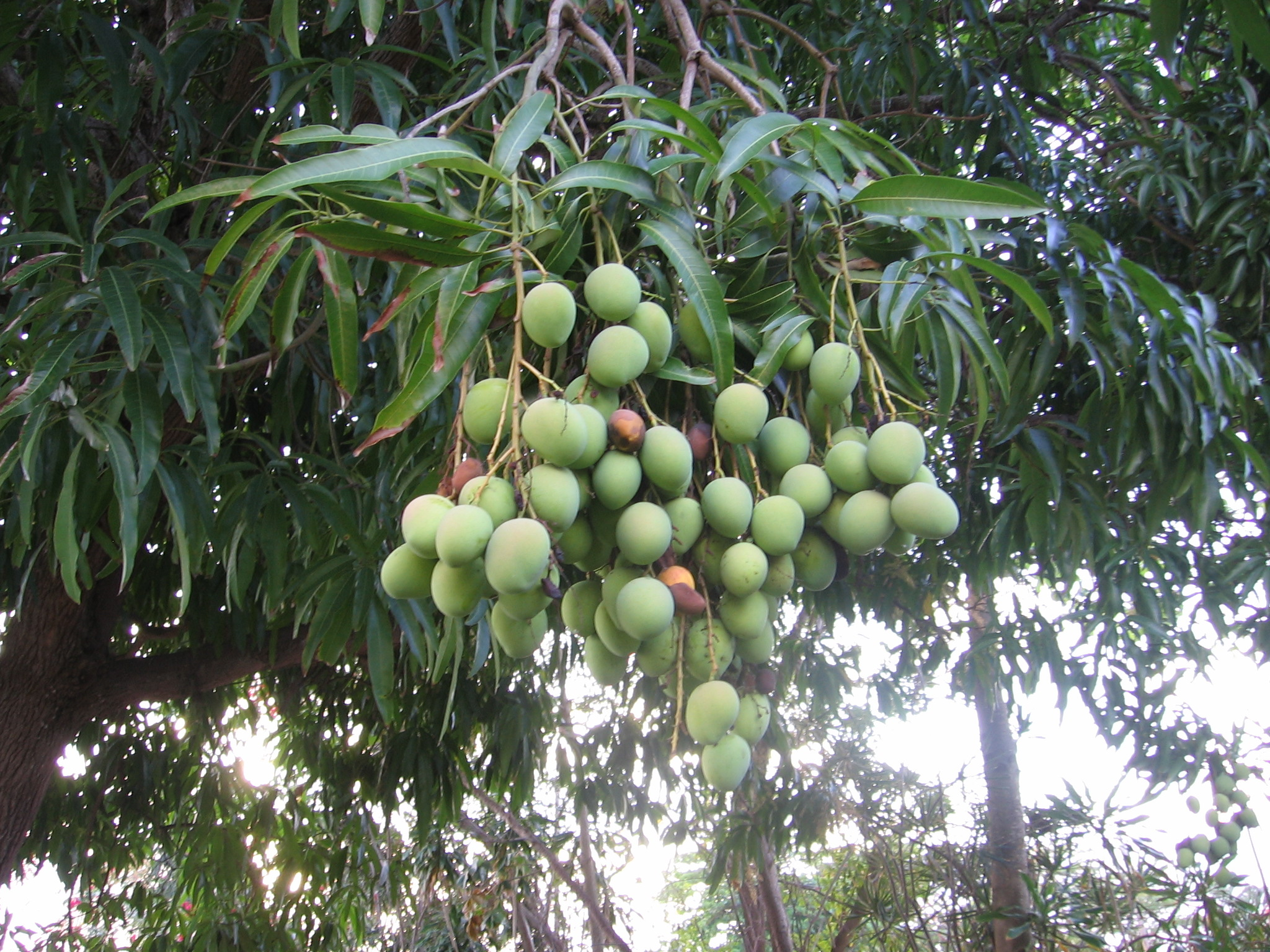
Unripe mangoes

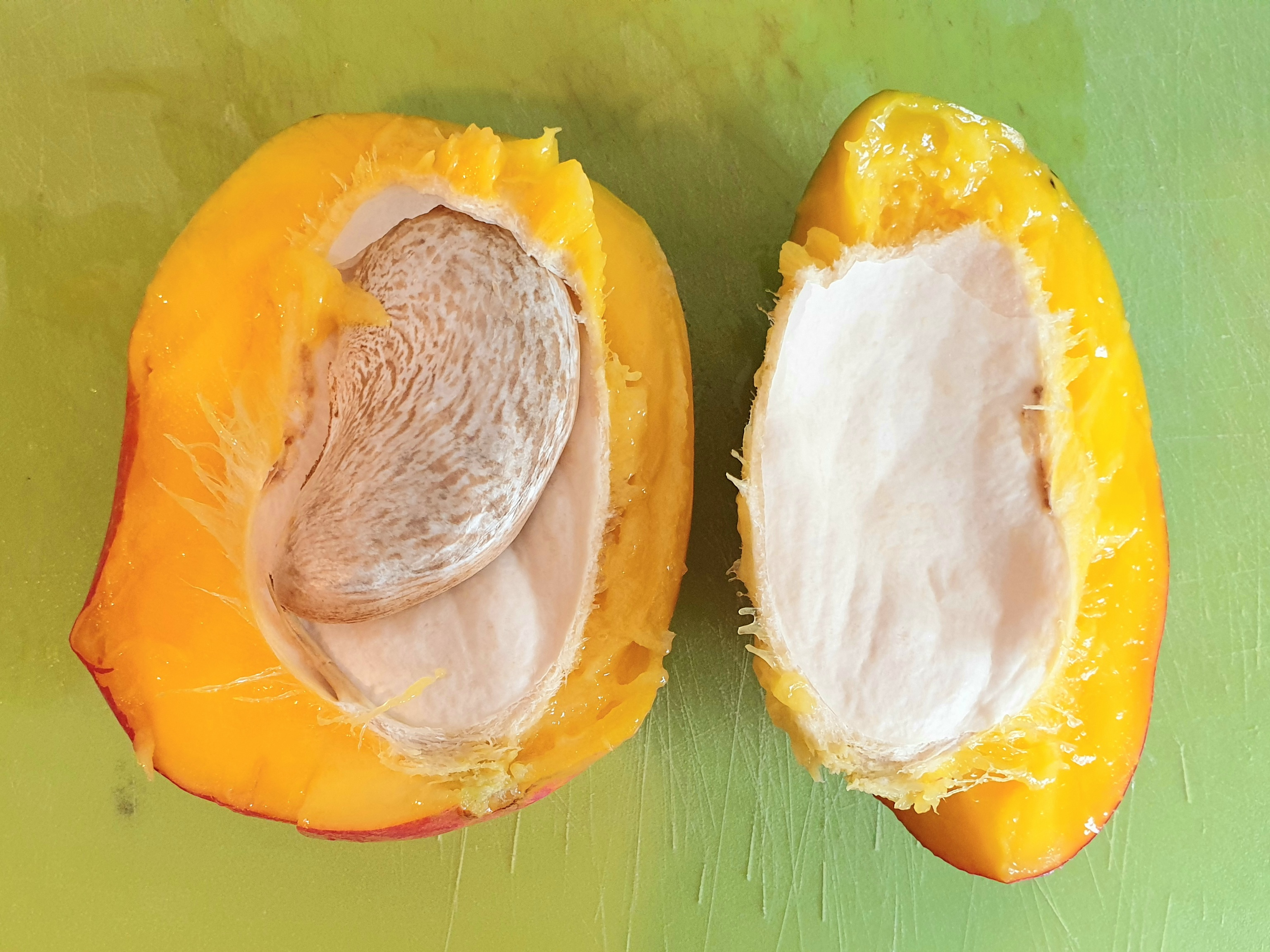
Fruit with single seed, cut open

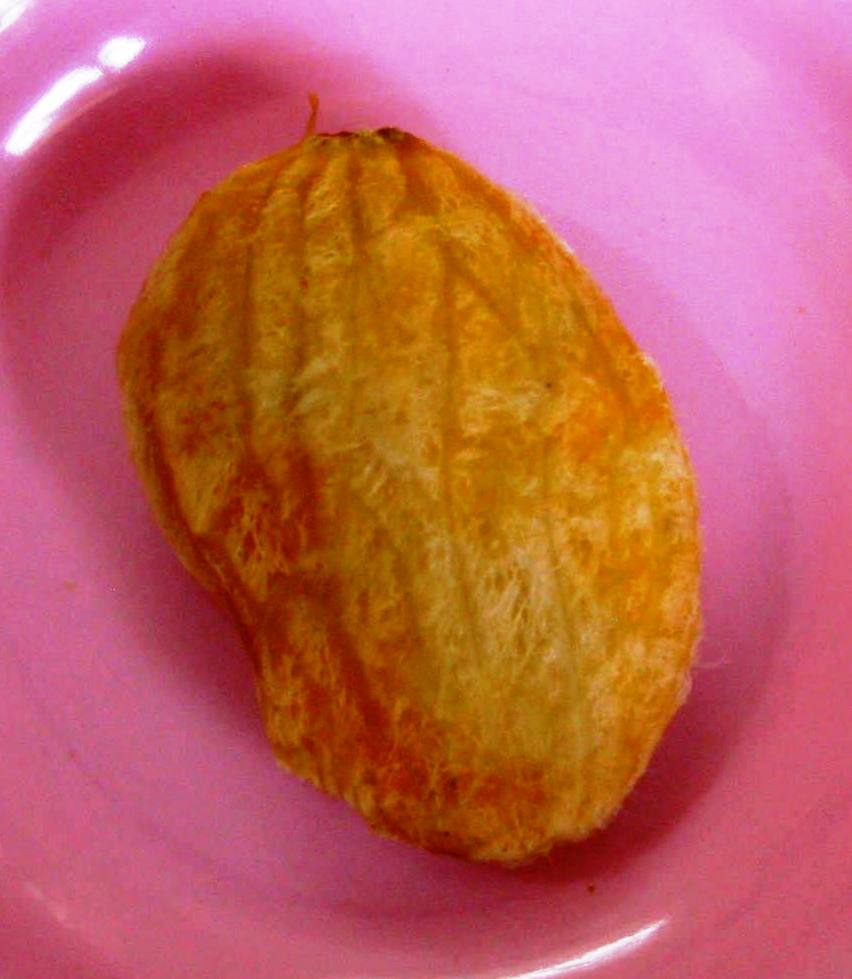
Stone (endocarp, surrounding the seed)

== Taxonomy ==
Mangoes originated from the region between northwestern Myanmar, Bangladesh, and northeastern India. The mango is considered an evolutionary anachronism, whereby seed dispersal was once accomplished by a now-extinct evolutionary forager, such as a megafauna mammal.

From their centre of origin, mangoes diverged into two genetically distinct populations: the subtropical Indian group and the tropical Southeast Asian group. The Indian group is characterized by having monoembryonic fruit, while the Southeast Asian group is characterized by polyembryonic fruit.

It was previously believed that mangoes originated from a single domestication event in South Asia before being spread to Southeast Asia, but a 2019 study found no evidence of a center of diversity in India. Instead, it identified a higher unique genetic diversity in Southeast Asian cultivars than in Indian cultivars, indicating that mangoes may have originally been domesticated first in Southeast Asia before being introduced to South Asia. However, the authors cautioned that the diversity in Southeast Asian mangoes might be the result of other reasons (like interspecific hybridization with other Mangifera species native to the Malesian ecoregion). Nevertheless, the existence of two distinct genetic populations identified by the study indicates that the domestication of the mango is more complex than previously assumed and would at least indicate multiple domestication events in Southeast Asia and South Asia. Other species in the genus Mangifera also produce edible fruit called "mangoes", most of which are found in the Malesian ecoregion.

=== Cultivars ===
There are hundreds of named mango cultivars. Mango orchards often grow several cultivars together to improve pollination. Many desired cultivars are monoembryonic and must be propagated by grafting to ensure they breed true. A common monoembryonic cultivar is 'Alphonso', an important export product, considered "the king of mangoes".

Cultivars that excel in one climate may fail elsewhere. For example, Indian cultivars such as 'Julie', a prolific cultivar in Jamaica, require annual fungicide treatments to escape the lethal fungal disease anthracnose in Florida. Asian mangoes are resistant to anthracnose.

The current western market is dominated by the cultivar 'Tommy Atkins', a seedling of 'Haden' that first fruited in 1940 in southern Florida and was initially rejected commercially by Florida researchers. Growers and importers worldwide have embraced the cultivar for its excellent productivity and disease resistance, shelf life, transportability, size, and appealing colour. Although the Tommy Atkins cultivar is commercially successful, other cultivars may be preferred by consumers for eating pleasure, such as Alphonso.

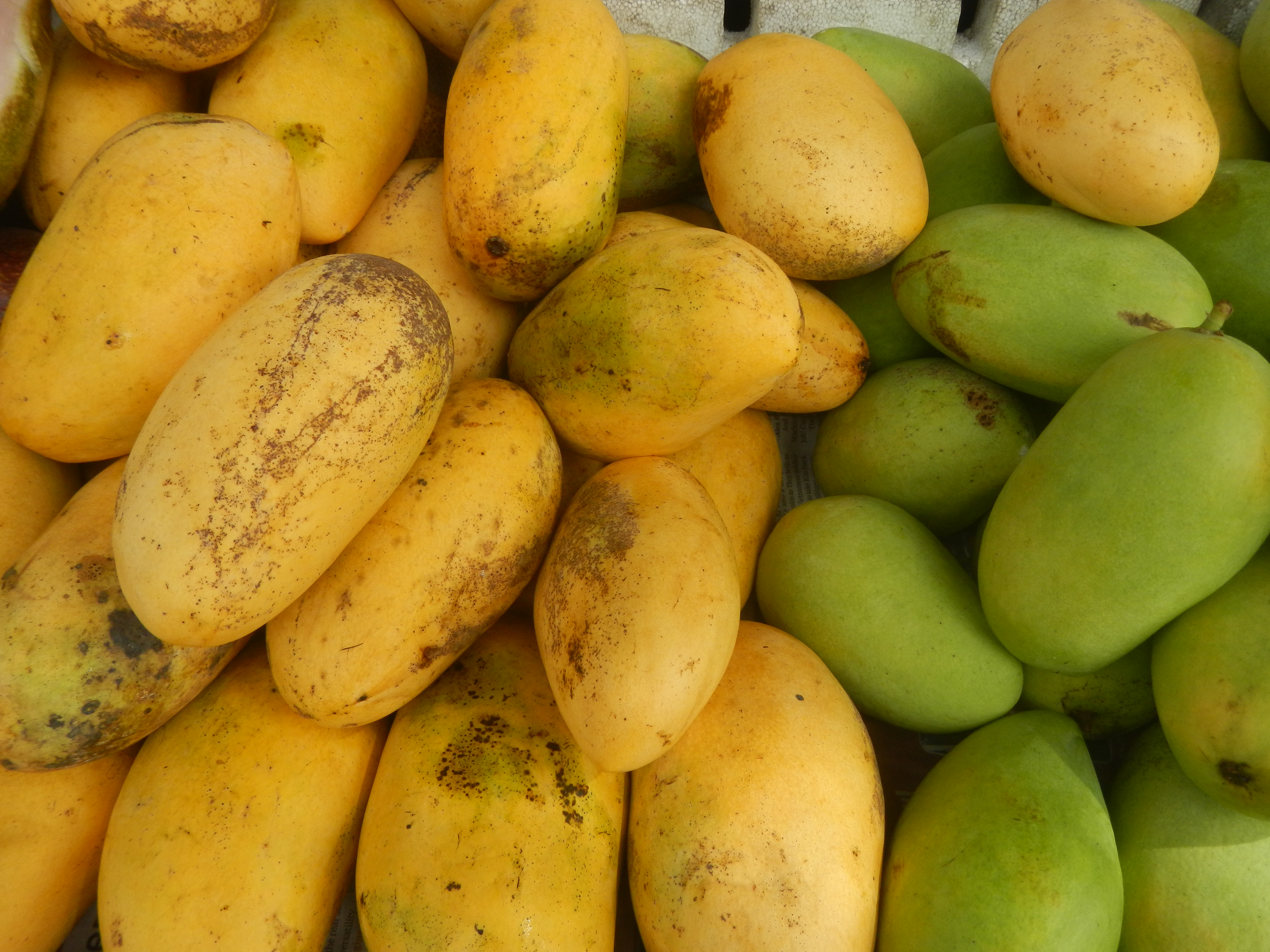
'Carabao', a typical "Southeast Asian type" polyembryonic cultivar

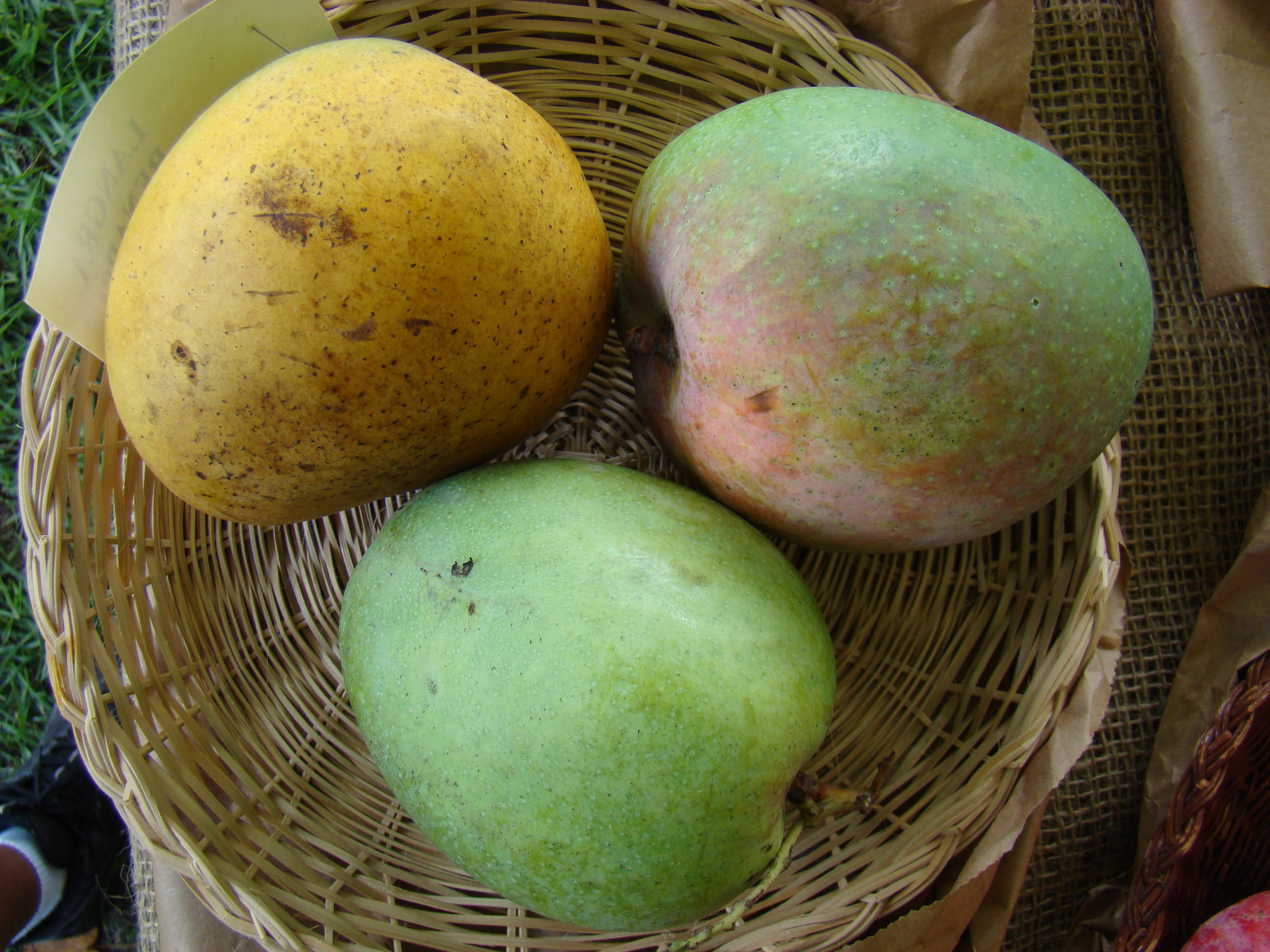
'Langra', a typical "Indian type" monoembryonic cultivar

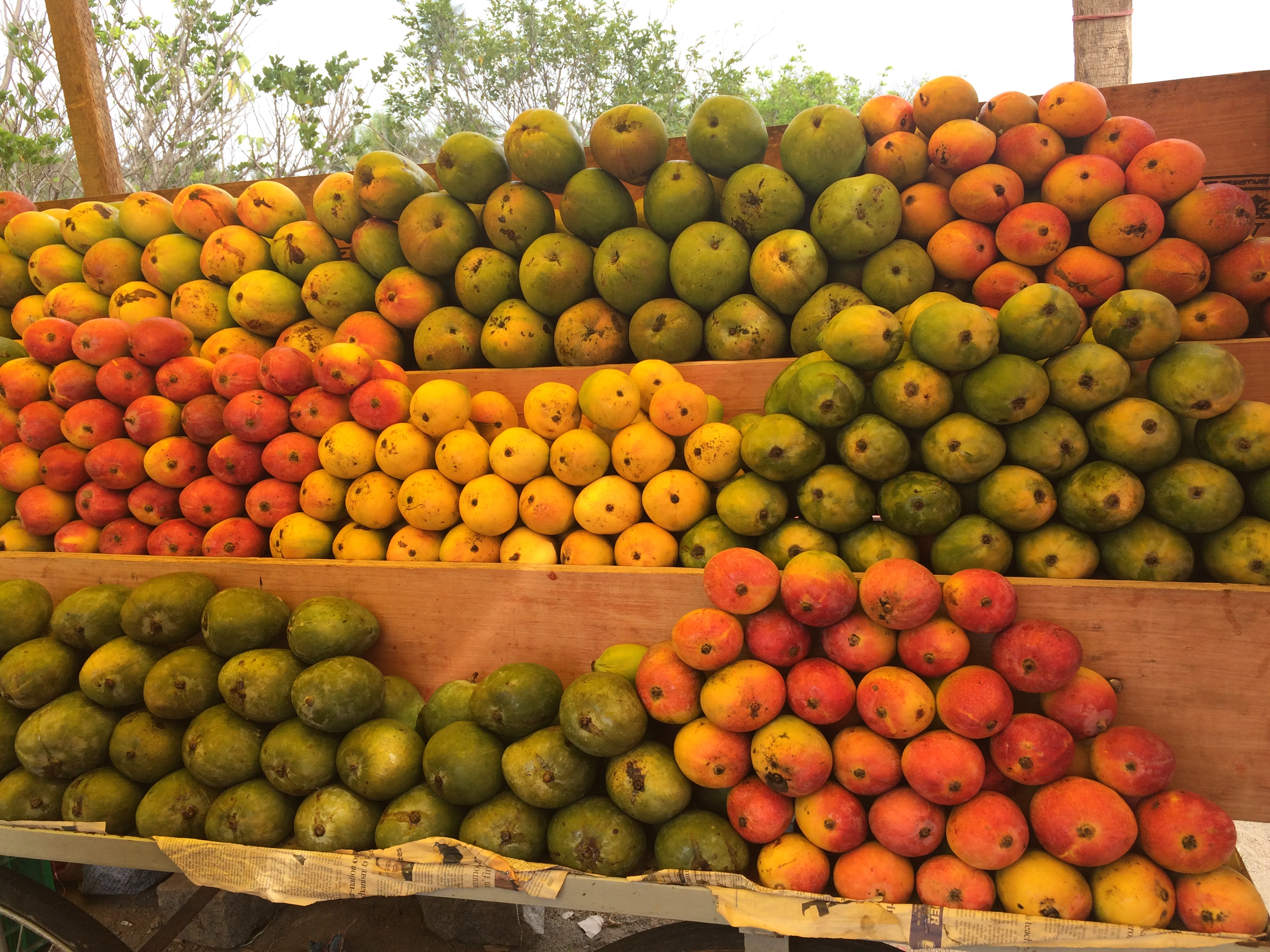
Many varieties from India

== Distribution and habitat ==
From tropical Asia, mangoes were introduced to East Africa by Arab and Persian traders in the ninth to tenth centuries. The 14th-century Moroccan traveler Ibn Battuta reported it at Mogadishu. It was spread further into other areas around the world during the Colonial Era. The Portuguese Empire spread the mango from their colony in Goa to East and West Africa. From West Africa, they introduced it to Brazil from the 16th to the 17th centuries. From Brazil, it spread northwards to the Caribbean and eastern Mexico by the mid to late 18th century. The Spanish Empire also introduced mangoes directly from the Philippines to western Mexico via the Manila galleons from at least the 16th century. Mangoes were only introduced to Florida by 1833.

== Cultivation ==
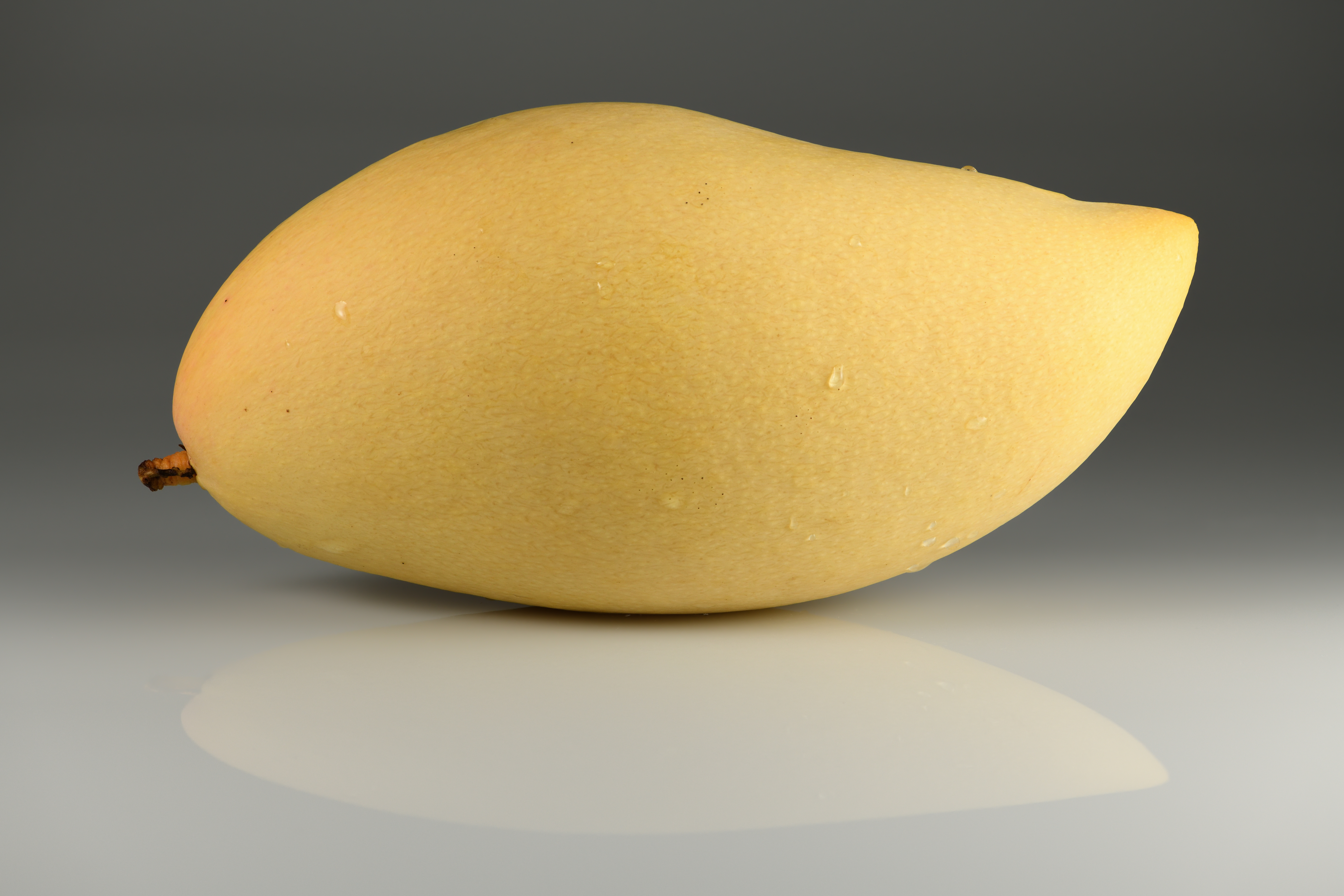
The 'Nam Dok Mai' cultivar originated in Thailand.

The mango is cultivated in most frost-free tropical and warmer subtropical climates. It is cultivated extensively in South Asia, Southeast Asia, East and West Africa, the tropical and subtropical Americas, and the Caribbean. Mangoes are also grown in Andalusia, Spain (mainly in Málaga province), as its coastal subtropical climate is one of the few places in mainland Europe that permits the growth of tropical plants and fruit trees. The Canary Islands are another notable Spanish producer of the fruit. Other minor cultivars include North America (in South Florida and the California Coachella Valley), Hawai'i, and Australia.

Many commercial cultivars grown in Europe are grafted onto the cold-hardy rootstock of the Gomera-1 mango cultivar, originally from Cuba. Its root system is well adapted to a coastal Mediterranean climate.

A breakthrough in mango cultivation was the use of potassium nitrate and ethrel to induce flowering in mangoes. The discovery was made by Filipino horticulturist Ramon Barba in 1974 and was developed from the unique traditional method of inducing mango flowering using smoke in the Philippines. It allowed mango plantations to induce regular flowering and fruiting year-round. Previously, mangoes were seasonal because they only flowered every 16 to 18 months. The method is now used in most mango-producing countries.

=== Diseases ===
Mango trees are subject to many diseases, including alternaria rot, anthracnose, bacterial black spot, and powdery mildew. Spongy tissue is a ripening disorder correlated with calcium deficiency and characterized by spongy, brown-black flesh beginning near the seeds. It was estimated in 1989 to affect approximately 30% of Alphonso mangoes. Among the pests of the fruit's cultivation is the mango mealybug; it sucks sap from inflorescences, causing reduced fruit set and seriously harming crop production.

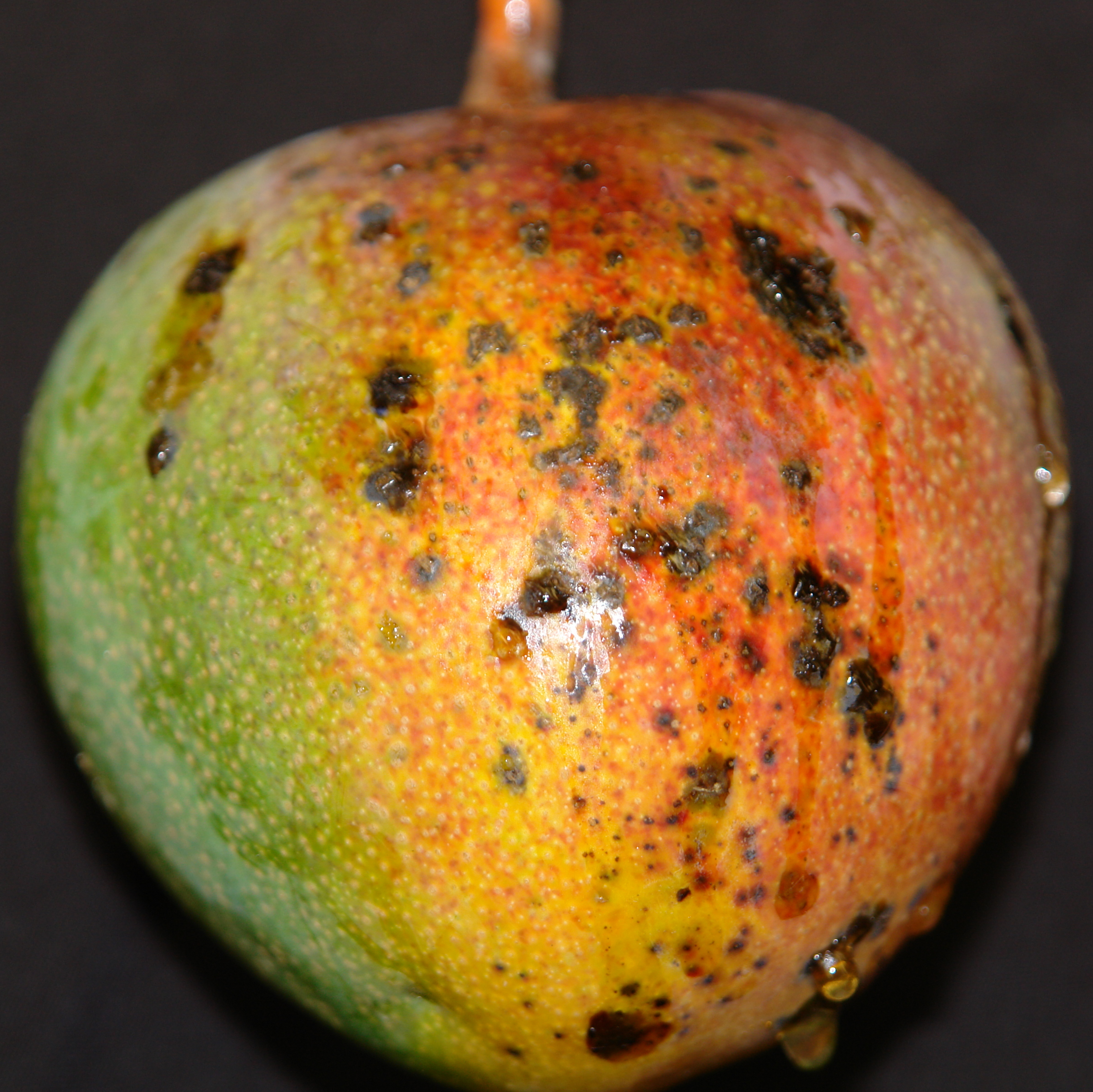
bacterial black spot of mango

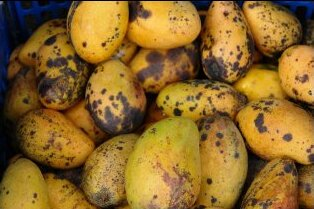
Anthracnose in fruit

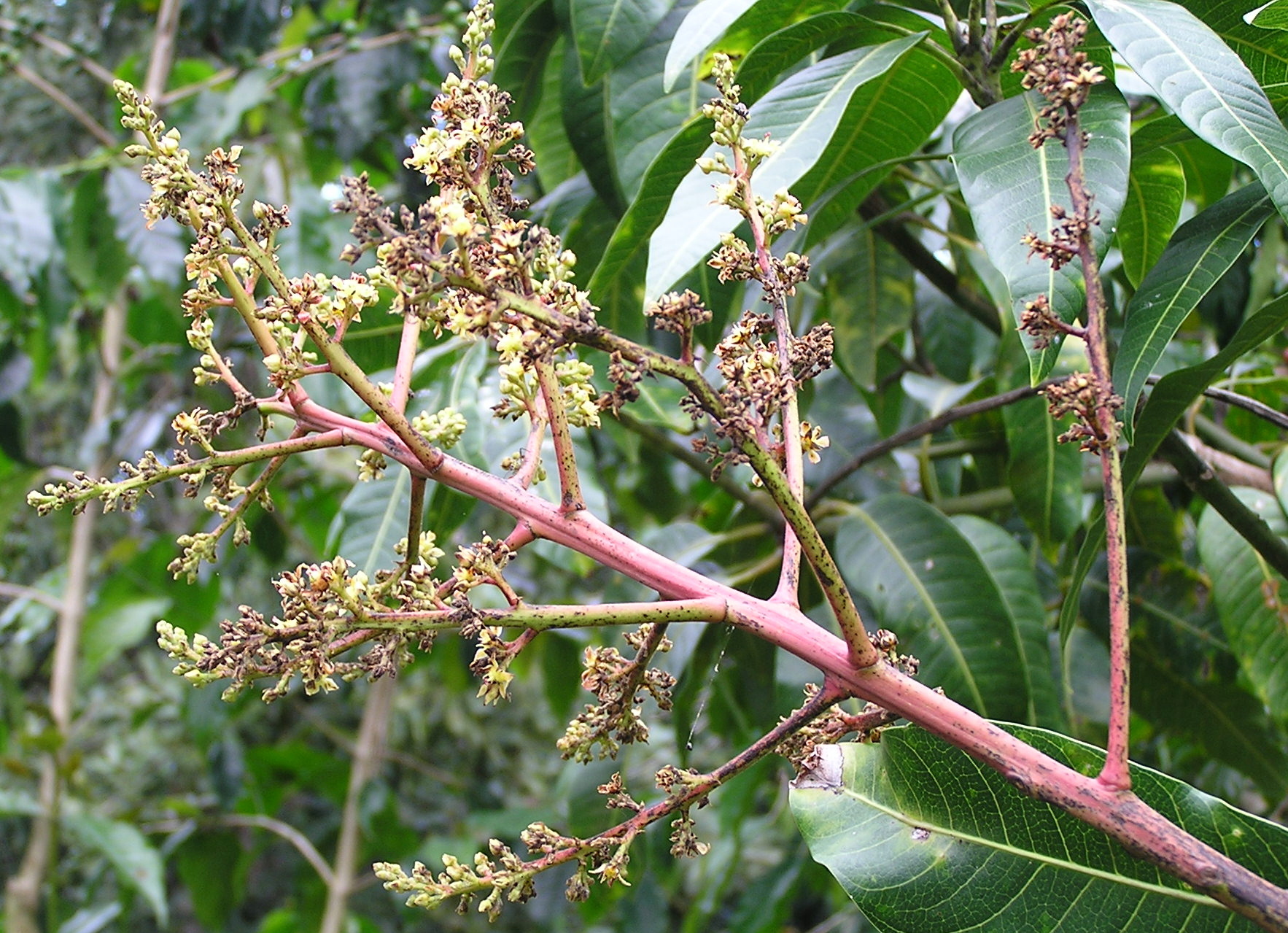
Anthracnose in inflorescence

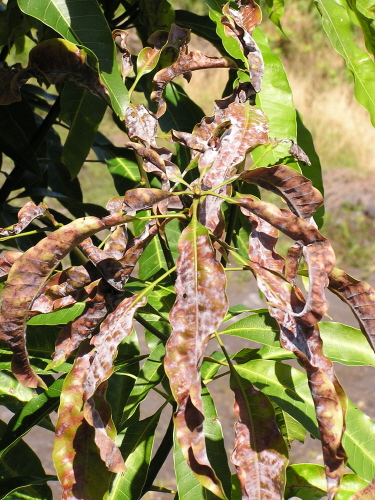
Powdery mildew causing leaf blight

== Production ==
Mango* production 2023, millions of tonnes
India	26.2
Indonesia	4.1
China	3.9
Mexico	2.7
Pakistan	2.6
Brazil	2.3
Malawi	2.1
World	61.1
*Includes mangosteens and guavas; Source: FAOSTAT of the United Nations

In 2023, world production of mangoes, mangosteens and guavas was 61 million tonnes, led by India with 43% of the total, and Indonesia and China as secondary producers.

Production of mangoes

Mango yield

== Culinary uses ==
Mangoes are generally sweet, although the taste and texture of the flesh varies across cultivars; some, such as Alphonso, have a soft, pulpy, juicy texture similar to an overripe plum, while others, such as Tommy Atkins, are firmer with a fibrous texture.

Mangoes are used in many cuisines. Sour, unripe mangoes are used in side dishes in Indian cuisine such as mango chutney and pickles such as avakaya.

A summer drink called aam panna is made with mangoes. Mango lassi is consumed throughout South Asia, prepared by mixing ripe mangoes or mango pulp with buttermilk and sugar.

In Indonesian cuisine, unripe mango is processed into asinan, rujak and sambal pencit/mangga muda, or eaten with edible salt.

Raw green mangoes can be sliced and eaten like a salad. In most parts of Southeast Asia, they are commonly eaten with fish sauce, vinegar, soy sauce, or with a dash of salt (plain or spicy) – a combination usually known as "mango salad" in English. In the Philippines, green mangoes are eaten with savory condiments such as bagoong (salty fish or shrimp paste), soy sauce, vinegar, or chilis. Mango float and mango cake, which use slices of ripe mangoes, are eaten in the Philippines.

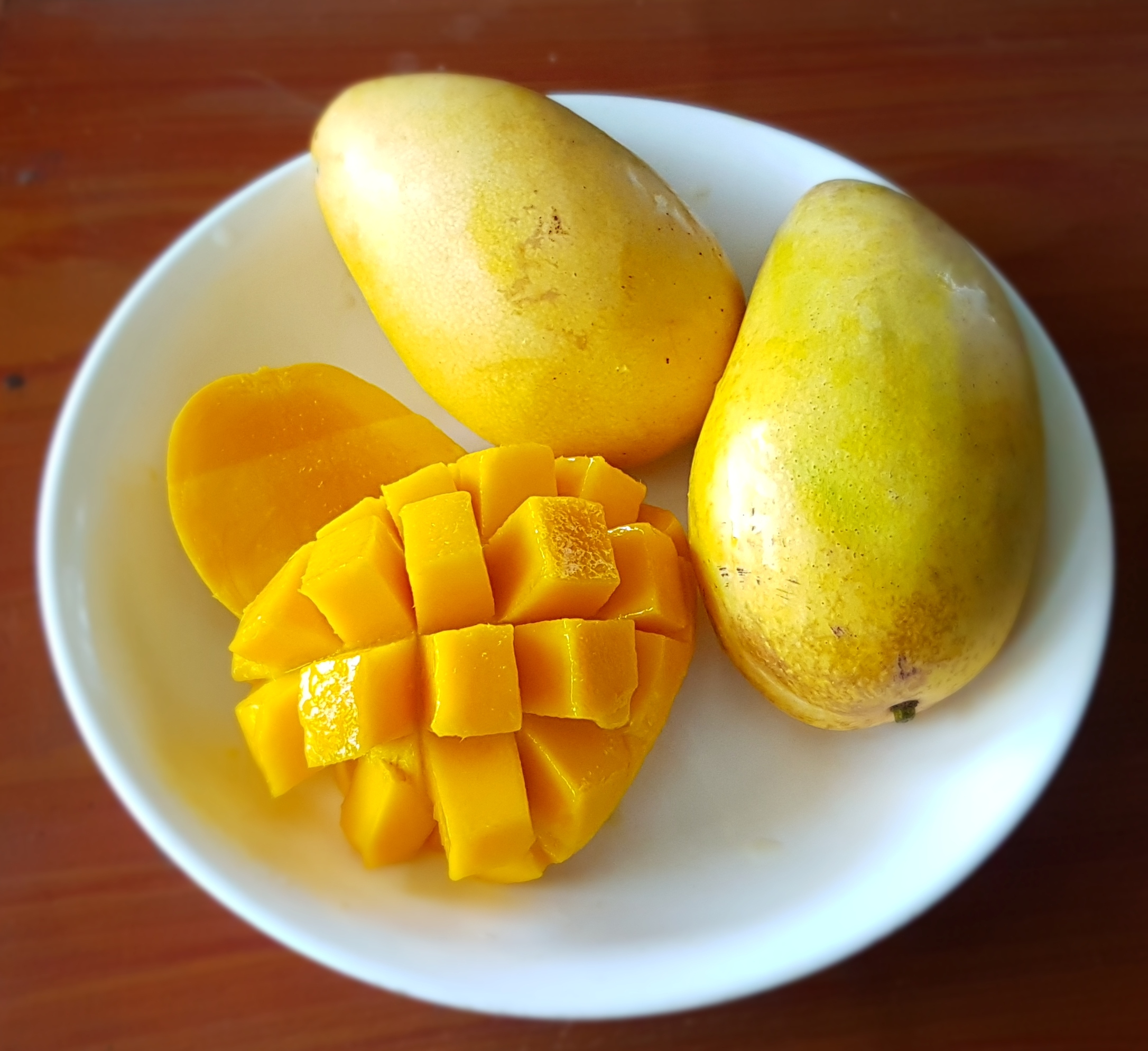
The "hedgehog" style of preparation on Carabao mangoes

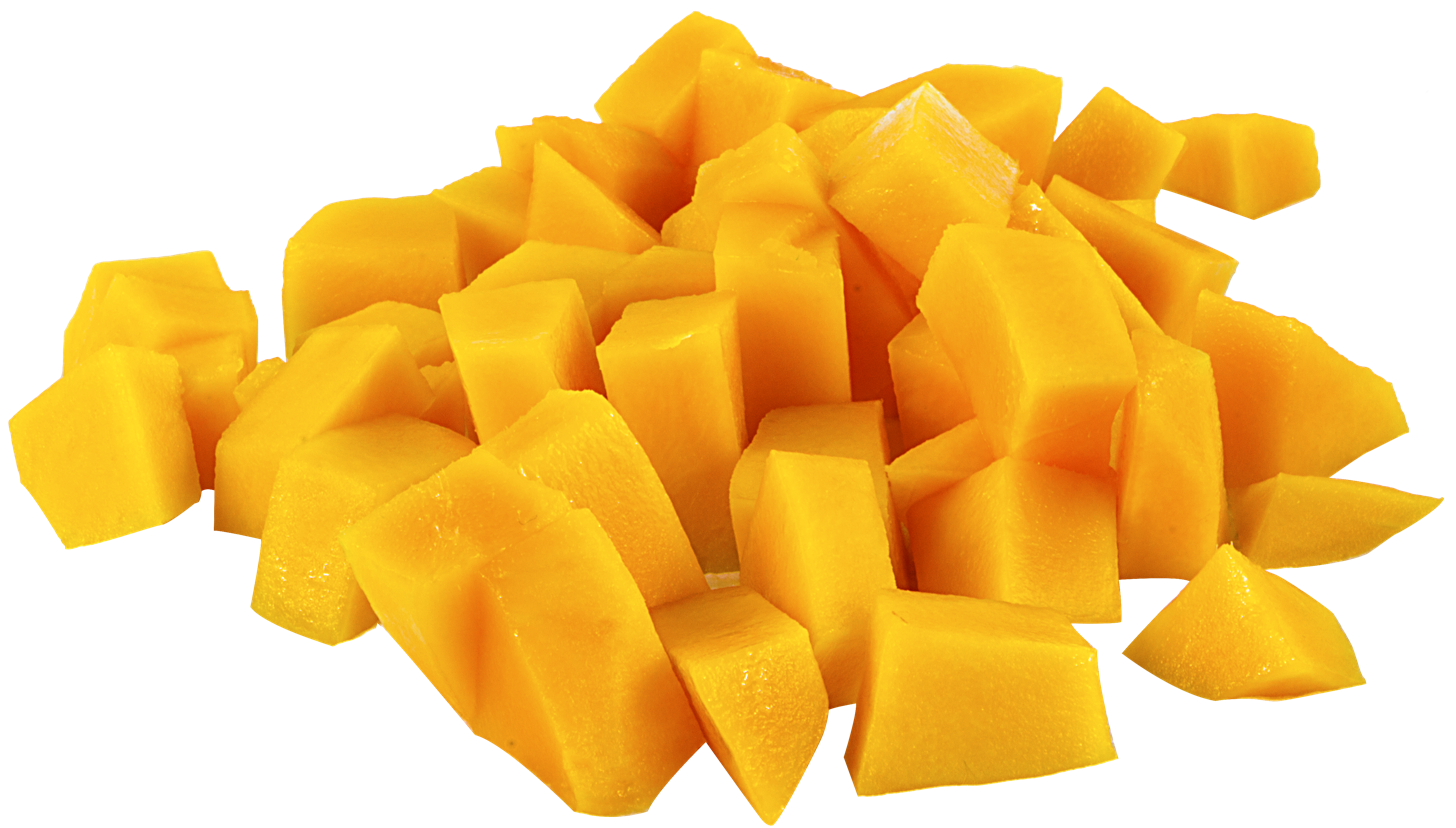
Alphonso mango chunks

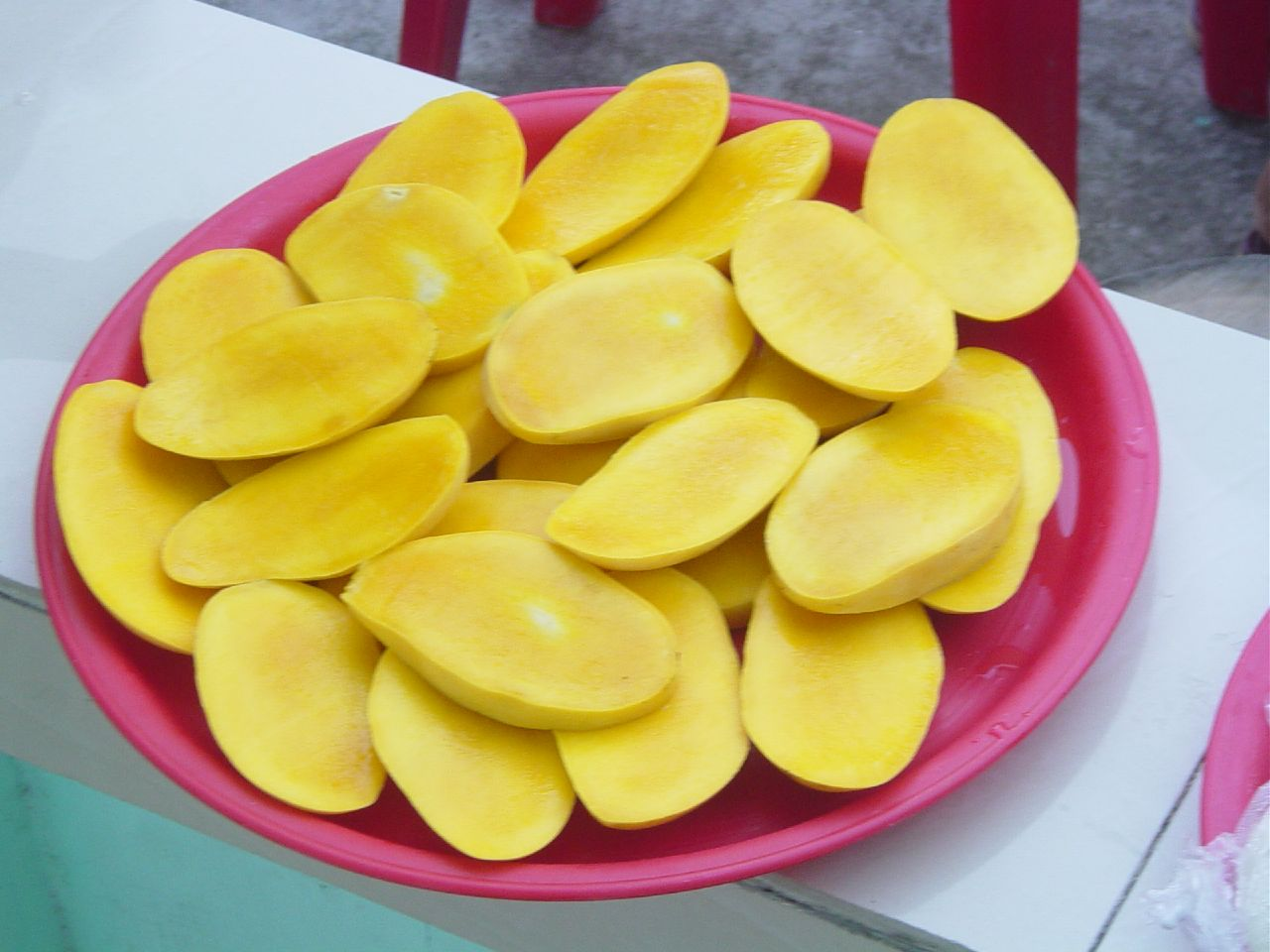
Sliced Ataulfo mangoes

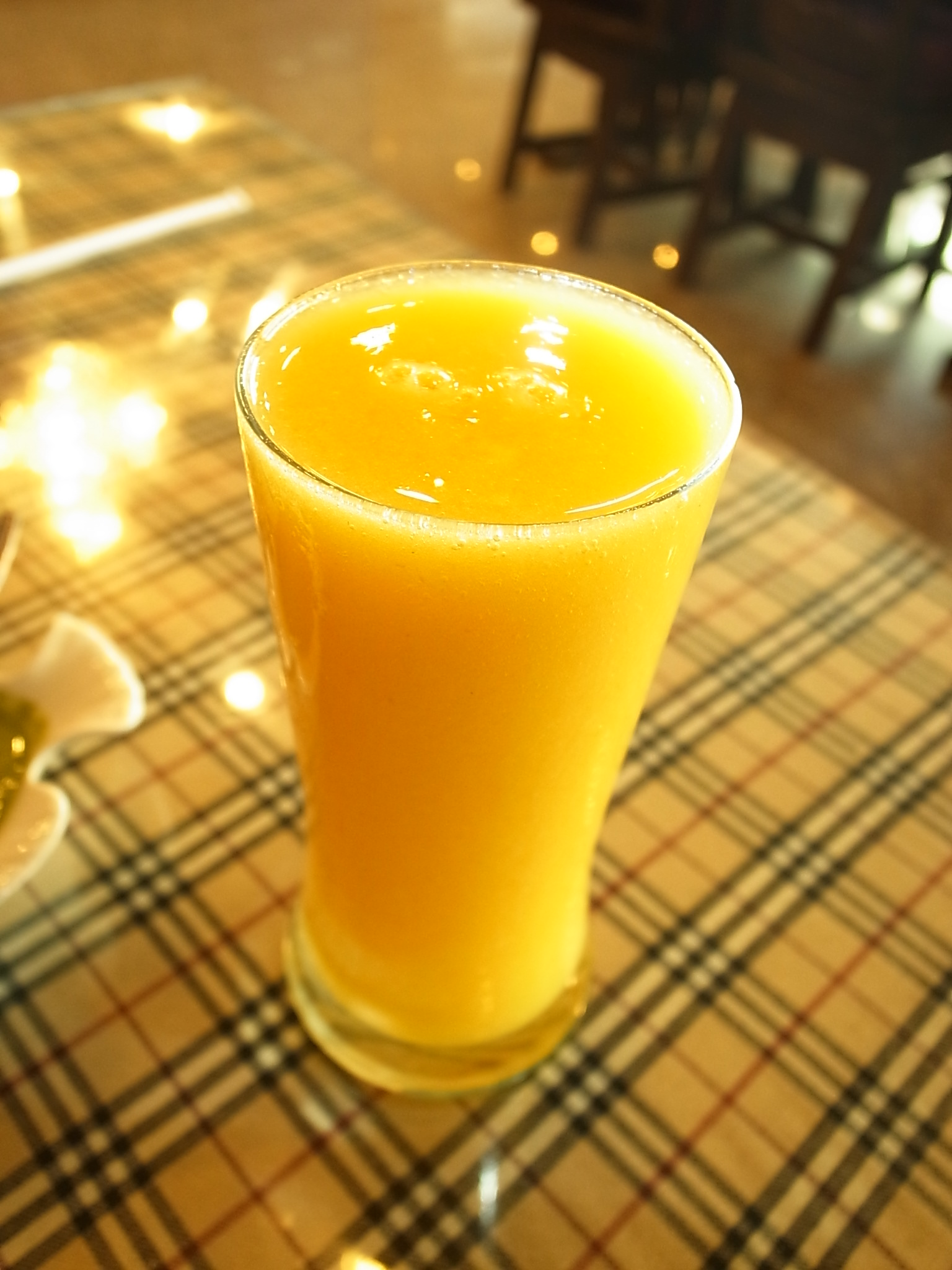
A glass of mango juice

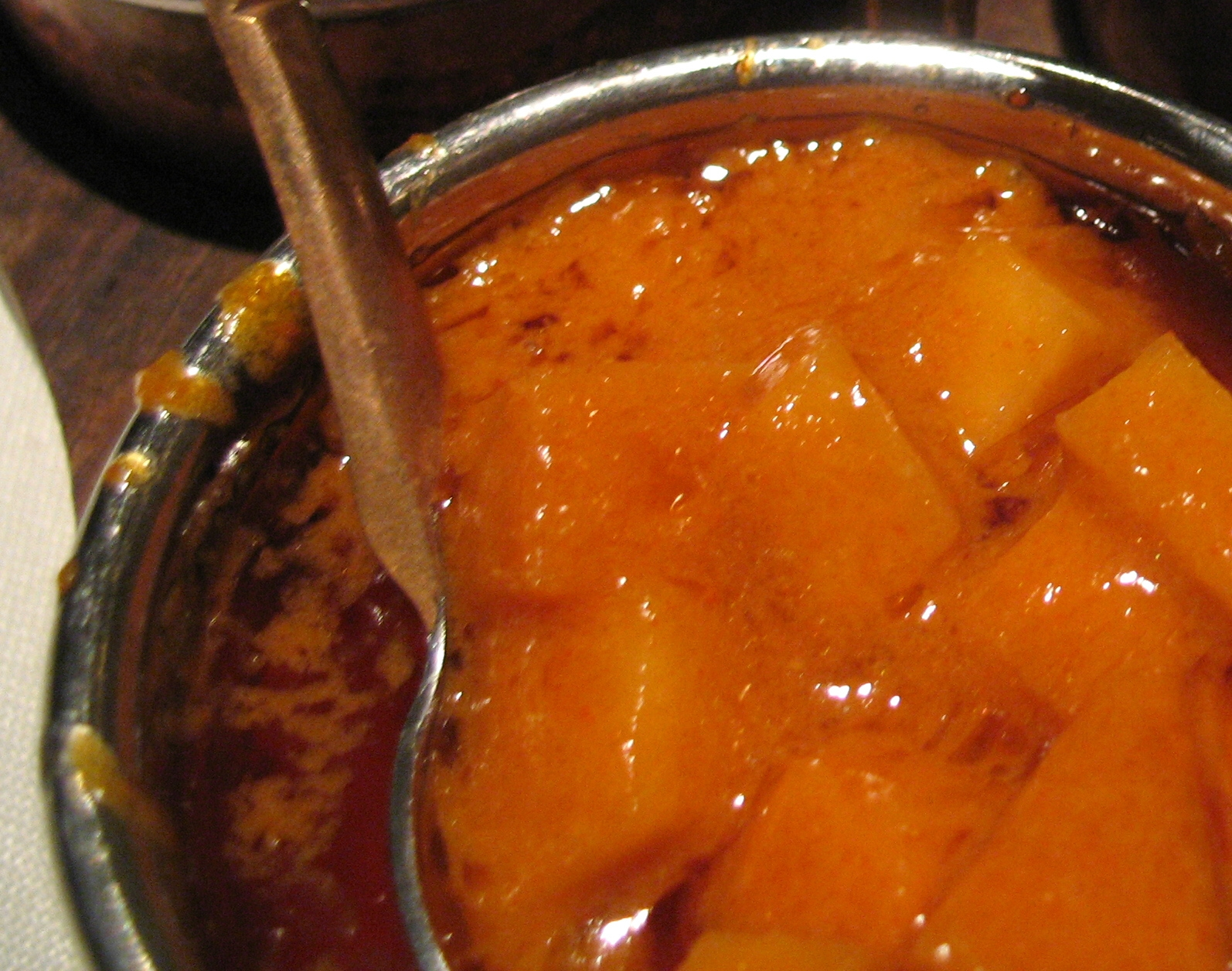
Mango chutney

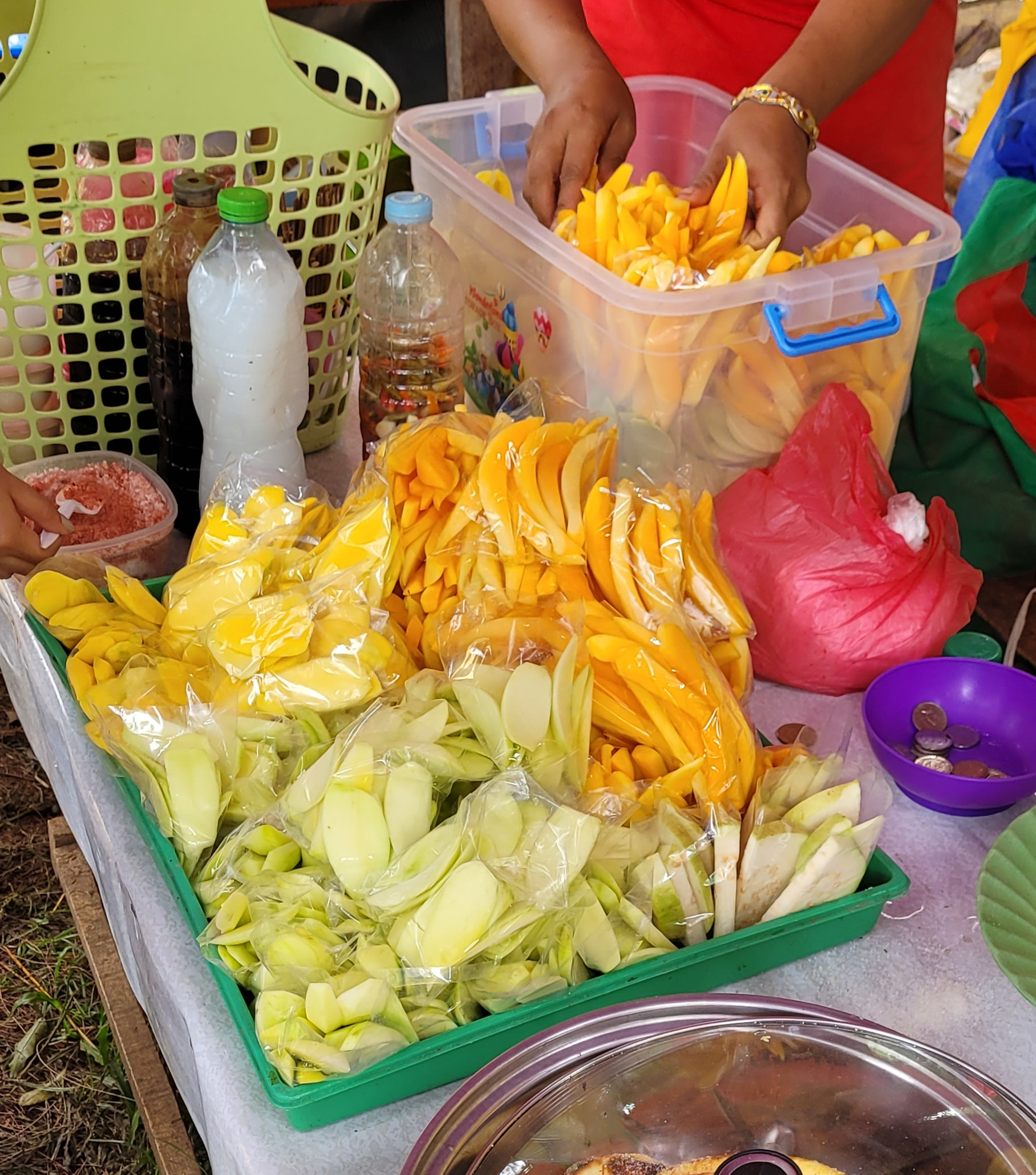
Sour unripe mangoes eaten with shrimp paste, salt, chili, vinegar or soy sauce in the Philippines

== Phytochemistry ==
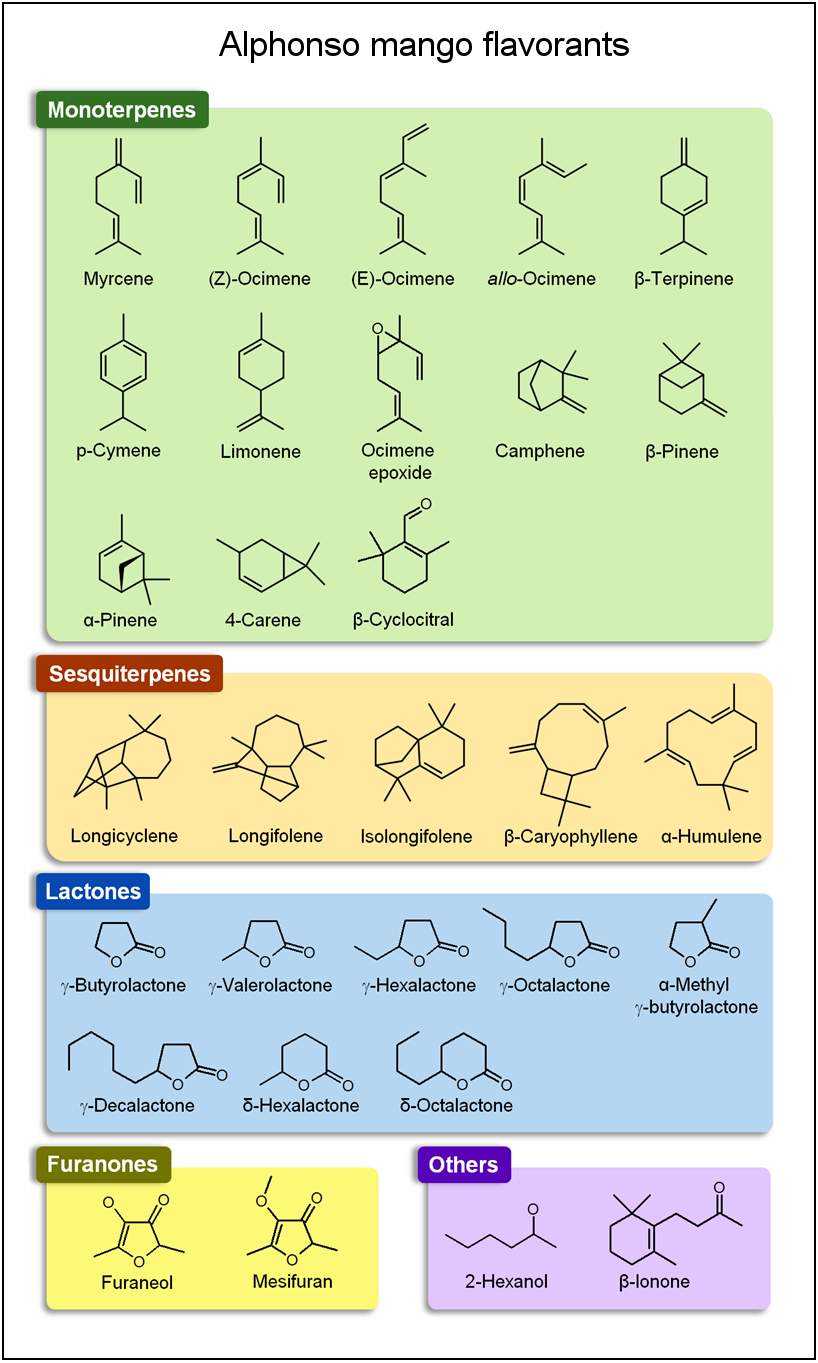
Major flavour chemicals of the 'Alphonso' mango from India

Numerous phytochemicals are present in mango peel and pulp, such as the triterpene lupeol. Mango peel pigments under study include carotenoids, such as the provitamin A compound, beta-carotene, lutein and alpha-carotene, and polyphenols, such as quercetin, kaempferol, gallic acid, caffeic acid, catechins and tannins. Mango contains a unique xanthonoid called mangiferin.

Phytochemical and nutrient content appears to vary across mango cultivars. Up to 25 different carotenoids have been isolated from mango pulp, the densest of which was beta-carotene, which accounts for the yellow-orange pigmentation of most mango cultivars. Mango leaves also have significant polyphenol content, including xanthonoids, mangiferin and gallic acid.

=== Flavour ===
The flavour of mango fruit is conferred by several volatile organic chemicals, mainly terpenes, furanones, lactones, and esters. Different varieties or cultivars of mangoes can have flavours composed of different volatile chemicals, or the same volatile chemicals in different quantities. In general, New World mango cultivars are characterized by the dominance of δ-3-carene, a monoterpene flavorant; whereas, high concentration of other monoterpenes such as (Z)-ocimene and myrcene, as well as the presence of lactones and furanones, is the unique feature of Old World cultivars. In India, 'Alphonso' is one of the most popular cultivars. In 'Alphonso' mango, the lactones and furanones are synthesized during ripening, whereas terpenes and the other flavorants are present in both the developing (immature) and ripening fruit. Ethylene, a ripening-related hormone well known to be involved in ripening of mango fruit, also causes changes in the flavour composition of mango fruit upon exogenous application. In contrast to the huge amount of information available on the chemical composition of mango flavour, the biosynthesis of these chemicals has not been studied in depth; only a handful of genes encoding the enzymes of flavour biosynthetic pathways have been characterized to date.

Mango
Nutritional value per 100 g (3.5 oz)
- Energy: 250 kJ (60 kcal)
- Carbohydrates: 15 g
- Sugars: 13.7
- Dietary fiber: 1.6 g
- Fat: 0.38 g
- Saturated: 0.092 g
- Monounsaturated: 0.14 g
- Polyunsaturated omega−3 omega−6: 0.071 g 0.051 g 0.019 g
- Protein: 0.82 g
Vitamins and minerals
Vitamins	Quantity %DV^{†}
Vitamin A equiv. beta-Carotene lutein zeaxanthin	6% 54 μg 6% 640 μg 23 μg
Thiamine (B1)	2% 0.028 mg
Riboflavin (B2)	3% 0.038 mg
Niacin (B3)	4% 0.669 mg
Pantothenic acid (B5)	4% 0.197 mg
Vitamin B6	7% 0.119 mg
Folate (B9)	11% 43 μg
Choline	1% 7.6 mg
Vitamin C	40% 36.4 mg
Vitamin E	6% 0.9 mg
Vitamin K	4% 4.2 μg
Minerals	Quantity %DV^{†}
Calcium	1% 11 mg
Copper	12% 0.111 mg
Iron	1% 0.16 mg
Magnesium	2% 10 mg
Manganese	3% 0.063 mg
Phosphorus	1% 14 mg
Potassium	6% 168 mg
Selenium	1% 0.6 μg
Sodium	0% 1 mg
Zinc	1% 0.09 mg
- Other constituents: Quantity
- Water: 83.5 g
- Link to USDA Database entry
- ^{†}Percentages estimated using US recommendations for adults, except for potassium, which is estimated based on expert recommendation from the National Academies.

=== Toxicity ===
Contact with oils in mango leaves, stems, sap, and skin can cause dermatitis and anaphylaxis in susceptible individuals. Those with a history of contact dermatitis induced by urushiol (an allergen found in poison ivy, poison oak, or poison sumac) may be most at risk for mango contact dermatitis. Other mango compounds potentially responsible for dermatitis or allergic reactions include mangiferin. Cross-reactions may occur between mango allergens and urushiol. Sensitized individuals may not be able to eat peeled mangoes or drink mango juice safely.

When mango trees are flowering in spring, local people with allergies may experience breathing difficulty, itching of the eyes, or facial swelling, even before flower pollen becomes airborne. In this case, the irritant is likely to be the vaporized essential oil from flowers. During the primary ripening season of mangoes, contact with mango plant parts – primarily sap, leaves, and fruit skin – is the most common cause of plant dermatitis in Hawaii.

== Nutrition ==
A raw mango fruit is 84% water, 15% carbohydrates, 1% protein, and has negligible fat (table). In a reference amount of 100 g (3.5 oz), raw mango supplies 60 calories and is a rich source of vitamin C (40% of the Daily Value, DV) with moderate amounts of folate (11% DV) and copper (12% DV), while other micronutrients are low in content (table).

== Culture ==
The mango is the national fruit of India, Pakistan, and the Philippines. It is the national tree of Bangladesh. In India, the harvesting and sale of mangoes is during March–May and this is annually covered by news agencies. In Tamil Nadu, the mango is one of the three royal fruits, along with banana and jackfruit, for their sweetness and flavor.

The mango has a traditional context in the culture of South Asia. In his edicts, the Mauryan emperor Ashoka references the planting of fruit- and shade-bearing trees along imperial roads in his Major Pillar Edict No.5:

On the roads banyan-trees were caused to be planted by me, (in order that) they might afford shade to cattle and men, (and) mango-groves were caused to be planted.

In medieval India, the Indo-Persian poet Amir Khusrau termed the mango "Naghza Tarin Mewa Hindustan" – "the fairest fruit of Hindustan". The Mughal Empire was especially fond of the fruit; the emperor Babur praises the mango in his Baburnama. Mughal emperor Akbar (1556–1605) is said to have planted a mango orchard of 100,000 trees near Darbhanga, Bihar. Mango flowers and leaves are used in the worship of the Hindu goddess Saraswati at the spring festival of Vasant Panchami. The leaves are used as decorations in celebrations of Ganesh Chaturthi for the elephant-headed god Ganesha. The Jain goddess Ambika is traditionally represented as sitting under a mango tree. The classical Sanskrit poet Kalidasa sang the praises of mangoes.

Paisley patterns, with a teardrop-shaped motif or boteh on shawls and saris, are named for the unripe mango in languages across the Indian subcontinent, such as kalka in Bengali, ambi in Punjabi, and kairi in Hindi. E. M. Forster's 1924 novel A Passage to India has the character Dr. Aziz suggest to the English character Cyril Fielding "For you I shall arrange a lady with breasts like mangoes". Mangoes were the subject of the mango cult in China during the Cultural Revolution as symbols of chairman Mao Zedong's love for the people.

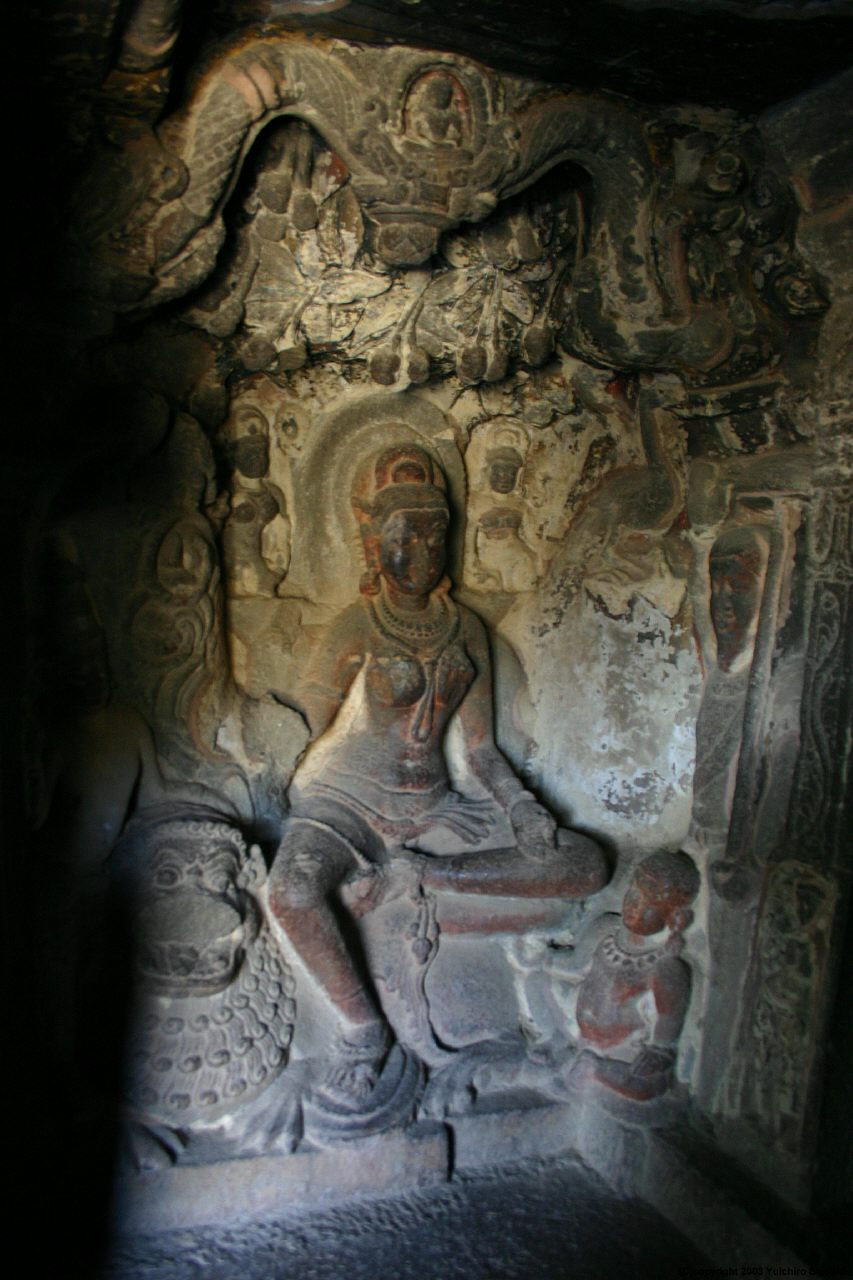
Image of Ambika under a mango tree in Cave 34 of the Ellora Caves

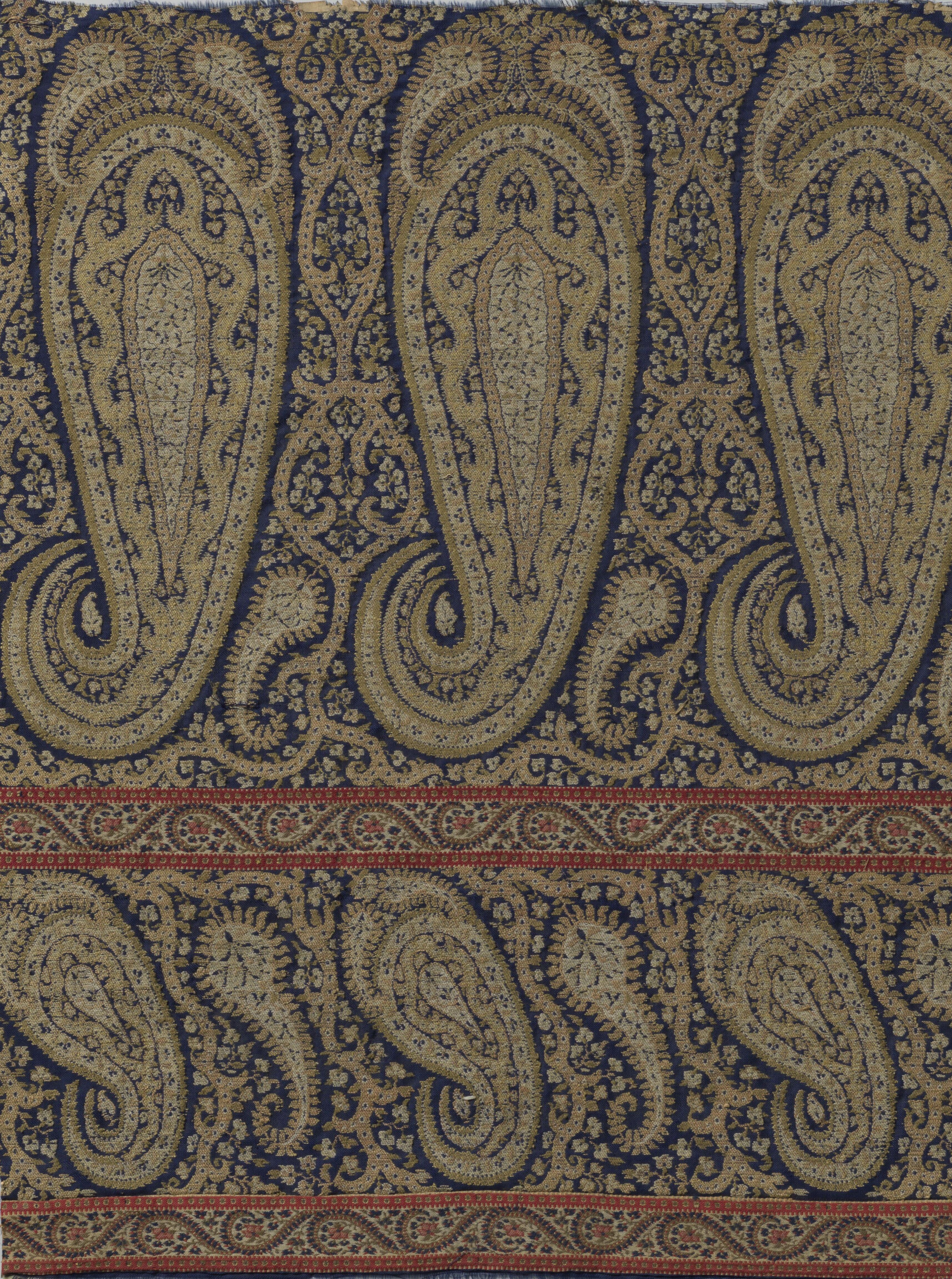
Paisley patterns are named for the mango in languages of the Indian subcontinent.
