= Irwin (mango) =

Mango cultivar

Mangifera 'Irwin'
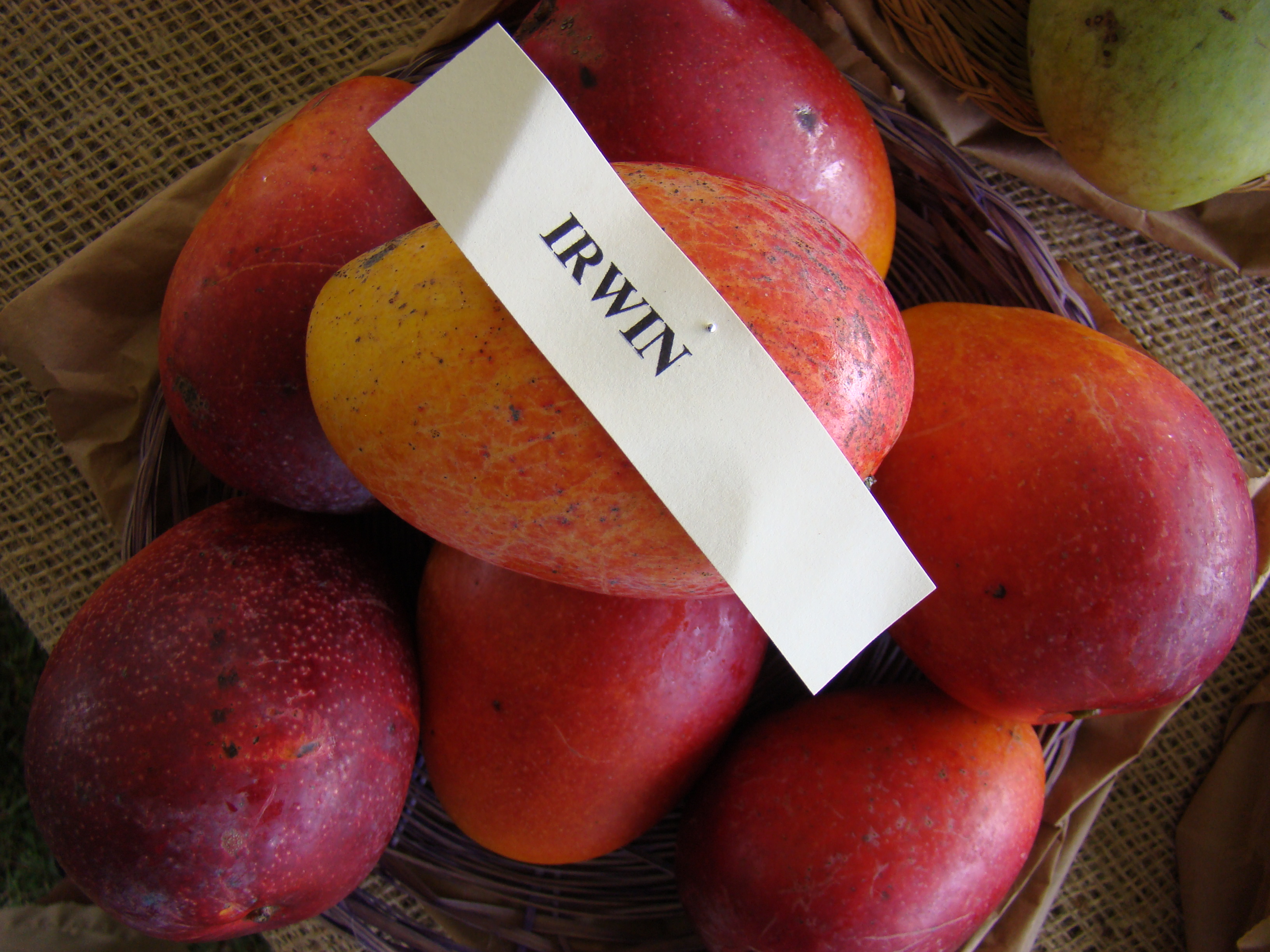
- Mature Irwin mangoes
- Genus: Mangifera
- Species: Mangifera indica
- Cultivar: 'Irwin'
- Origin: Florida, US

The 'Irwin' mango is a commercial mango cultivar which was developed in South Florida. This variety has a smooth bright red colored fruit with sweet aroma along with juicy pulp. TSS was measured above 20%.

== History ==
The original Irwin tree was a seedling of the Lippens cultivar that was open-cross pollinated with Haden, planted on the property of F.D. Irwin in Miami, Florida in 1939. The tree first bore fruit in 1945 and was named and described in 1949. The fruit gained commercial acceptance due to its good production, flavor, relative disease resistance, and attractive color. 'Irwin' has also been sold as a nursery stock tree for home growing in Florida.

Today, Irwin is grown on a commercial scale in a number of countries, including Japan, Taiwan, and Australia, where it was introduced in the 1970s.

The Irwin mango was first grown in Taiwan in 1962 by Cheng Han-chih (鄭罕池) in Douliuzai Village in the Yujing District of Tainan. In 1973, the government designated Douliuzai Village as a special mango cultivation zone. By the 1970s the residents of Douliuzai Village were known for their wealth due to mango cultivation. Cheng Han-chih is considered to be the godfather of Taiwan's lucrative modern mango sector. Irwin mangos have been the most popular mango in the Taiwanese market for 50 years.

Irwin trees are planted in the collections of the USDA's germplasm repository in Miami, the University of Florida's Tropical Research and Education Center in Homestead, Florida, and the Miami-Dade Fruit and Spice Park, also in Homestead.

== Description ==
Irwin fruit is of ovate shape, with a rounded base and a pointed apex, lacking a beak. The smooth skin develops an eye-catching dark red blush at maturity. The flesh is yellow and has a mild but sweet flavor and a pleasant aroma. It is fiberless and contains a monoembryonic seed. The fruit typically matures from June to July in Florida and is often borne in clusters.

The trees are moderately vigorous growers capable of exceeding 20 feet in height if left unpruned, developing open canopies.

== See also ==
- List of mango cultivars
