= Lippens (mango) =

Mango cultivar

Mangifera 'Lippens'
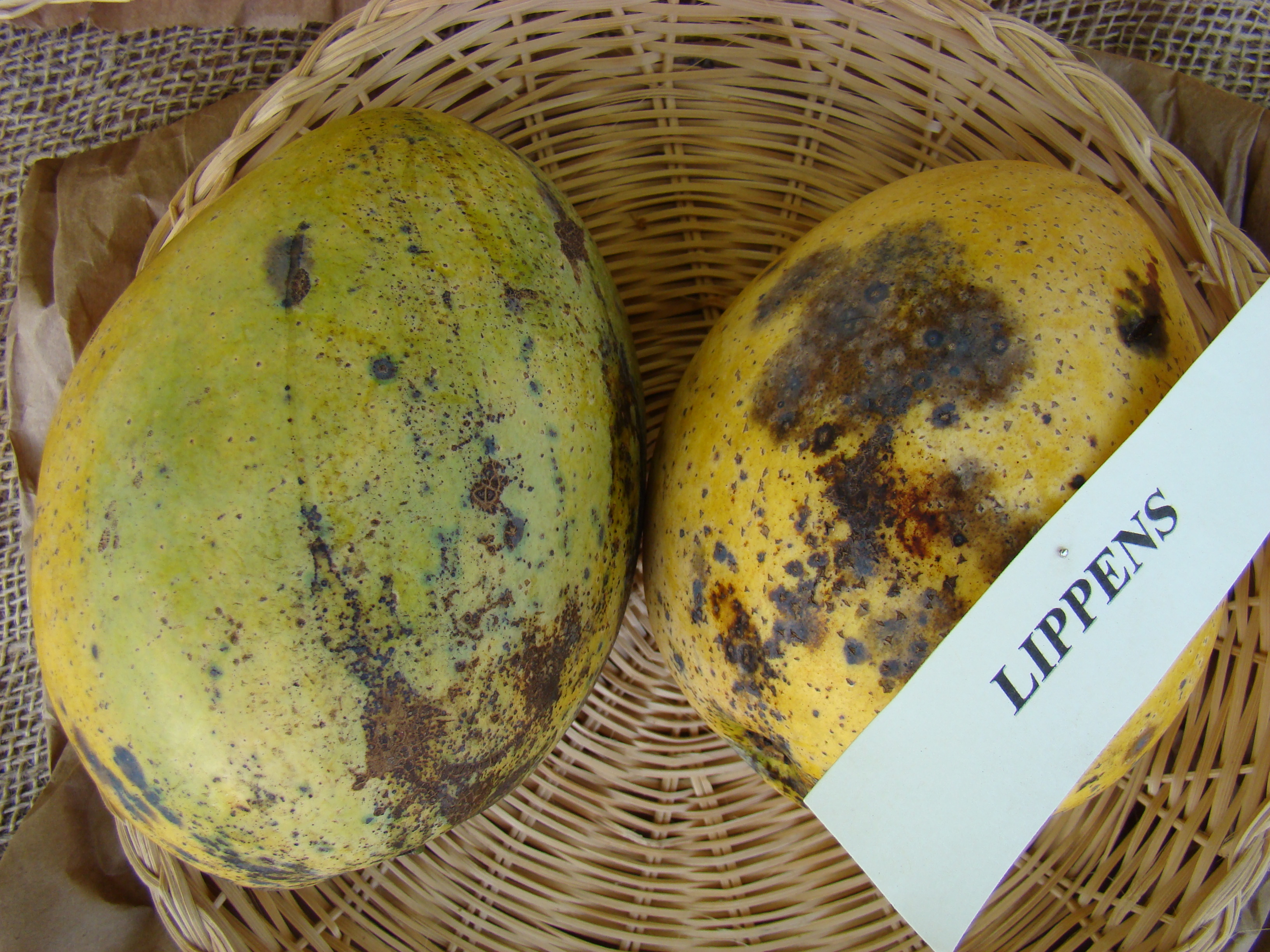
- Display of 'Lippens' mango at the Redland Summer Fruit Festival, Fruit and Spice Park, Homestead, Florida
- Genus: Mangifera
- Species: Mangifera indica
- Hybrid parentage: 'Haden' × unknown
- Cultivar: 'Lippens'
- Origin: Florida, US

The 'Lippens' mango is a named mango cultivar that originated in south Florida.

== History ==
The original tree was reportedly grown from a Haden mango seed planted on the property of Peter and Irene Lippens in Miami, Florida in 1931. The tree first fruited in 1938, and commercial propagation began in 1945. A 2005 pedigree analysis indicated that Lippens was indeed a seedling of Haden.

Lippens was described by the Florida Mango Forum in 1947, and noted for its eating quality, good production, and disease resistance. Thus it was considered to have good commercial potential. Though it never became widely commercially grown, the variety was sold on a limited scale as a nursery tree for home growers in Florida. Lippens is also a parent of several Florida mangoes, including Irwin, Jewel, and Golden Lippens.

Lippens trees are planted in the collections of the USDA's germplasm repository in Miami, Florida, the University of Florida's Tropical Research and Education Center in Homestead, Florida, and the Miami–Dade Fruit and Spice Park, also in Homestead.

== Description ==
Lippens fruit has an ovate to oblong shape and averages about a pound in weight at maturity. The apex is rounded and lacks a beak. The skin is yellow at maturity and develops a pink or crimson blush. The flesh is deep yellow in color. It is sweet, fiberless, and contains a monoembryonic seed. The fruit typically ripens from late June to July in Florida.

The trees are vigorous growers, growing to medium size with compact and dense canopies.
