= Chukou Nature Center =

Nature center in Fanlu, Chiayi County, Taiwan

Chukou Nature Center 觸口自然教育中心
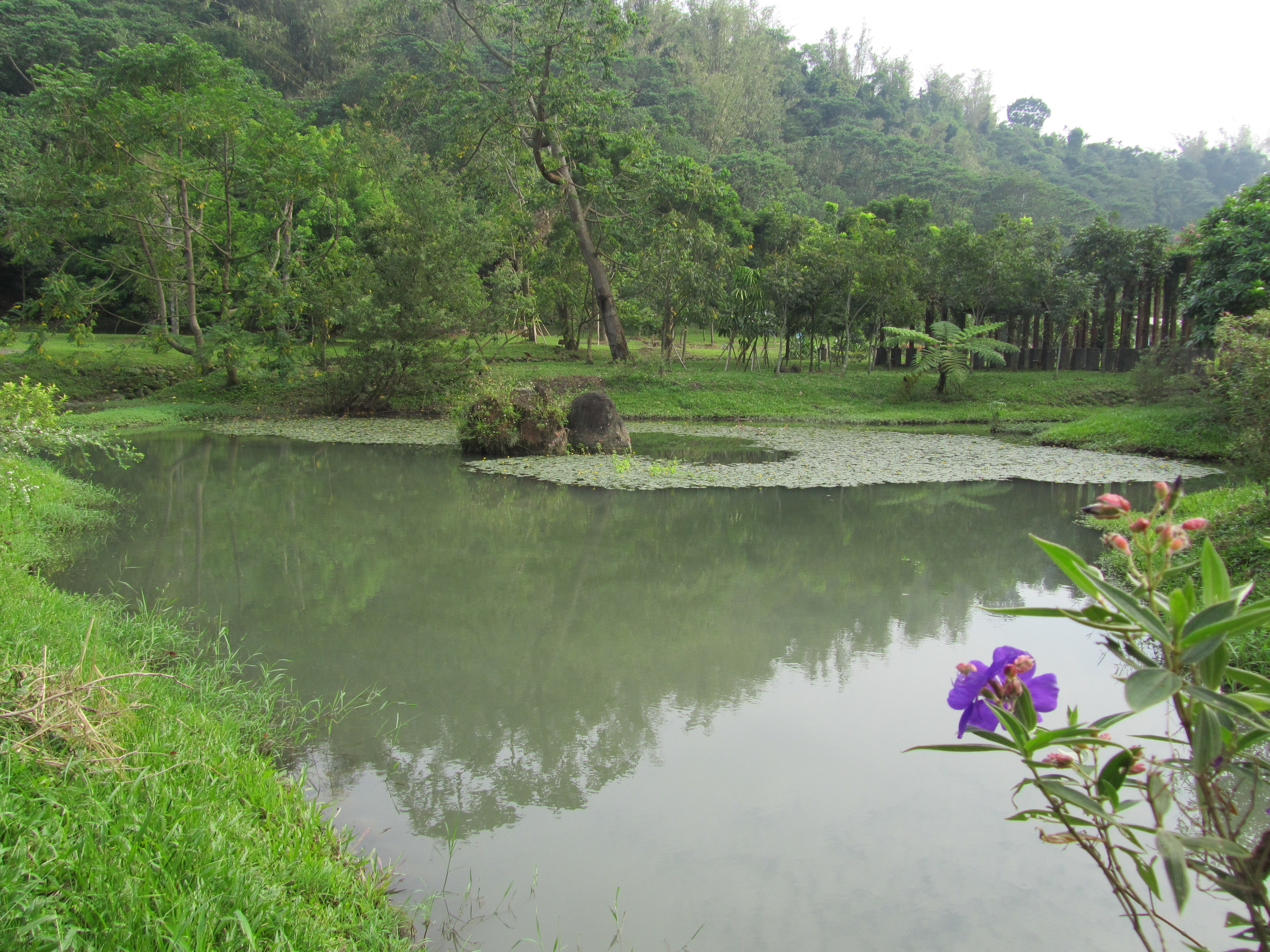

Ecology
- Biome: nature center

Geography
- Country: Fanlu, Chiayi County, Taiwan
- Coordinates: 23°27′11.6″N 120°33′32.6″E

The Chukou Nature Center (traditional Chinese: 觸口自然教育中心; simplified Chinese: 触口自然教育中心; pinyin: Chùkǒu Zìrán Jiàoyù Zhōngxīn) is a nature center in Xinfu Village, Fanlu Township, Chiayi County, Taiwan.

== History ==
The site of the center was originally the sugar farm of Taiwan Sugar Corporation. It was then later turned into Chukou Nature Center. In 2004, the Chiayi Forest District Office established the Tree Bank and Forest Ecological Park at the center.

== Ecology ==
The center is the center providing trees from various rare species. It also features drift-wood storage, eco-waterways and greenhouses.

== See also ==
- List of tourist attractions in Taiwan
