= Shanlong Vegetable Park =

Agricultural land in Nangan, Lienchiang, Taiwan

Shanlong Vegetable Park 山隴蔬菜公園
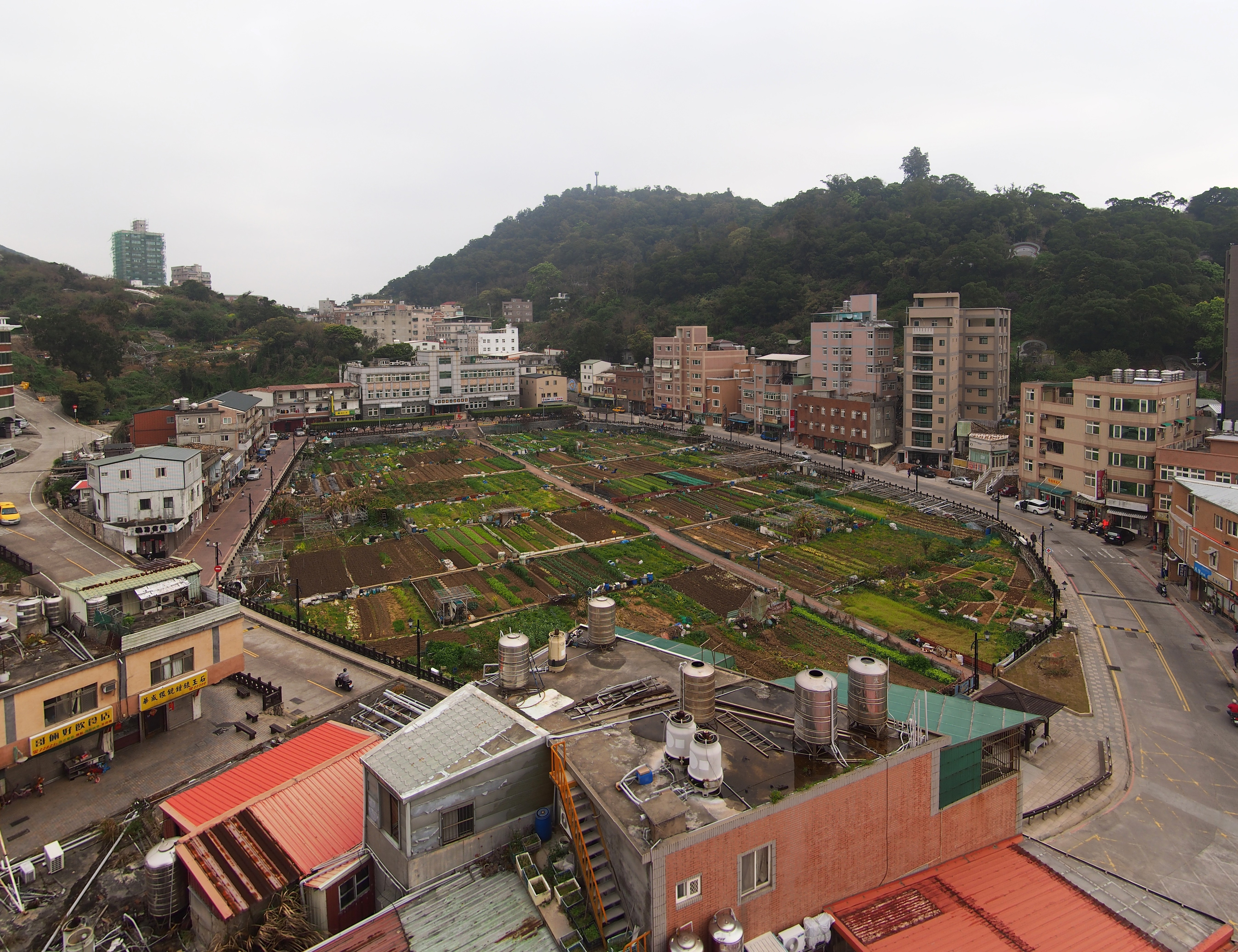
- Town/City: Nangan Township, Lienchiang County, Fuchien Province, Republic of China
- Coordinates: 26°09′25.6″N 119°57′07.0″E

The Shanlong Vegetable Park (traditional Chinese: 山隴蔬菜公園; simplified Chinese: 山陇蔬菜公园; pinyin: Shānlǒng Shūcài Gōngyuán) is an agricultural land in Nangan Township, Lienchiang County, Fuchien Province, Republic of China.

== History ==
The park consists of several farmlands belong to several people. Due to the difficulty in making commercial development in the land due to many land ownership, the Lienchiang County Government decided to beautify the area and named it Shanlong Vegetables Park.

== Business ==
Produce from this land are sent to the nearby Shizi Market to be sold locally in the Matsu Islands.

== See also ==
- Agriculture in Taiwan
