= Zhuzihu Ponlai Rice Foundation Seed Field Story House =

Building in Beitou, Taipei, Taiwan

- 竹子湖蓬萊米原種田故事館
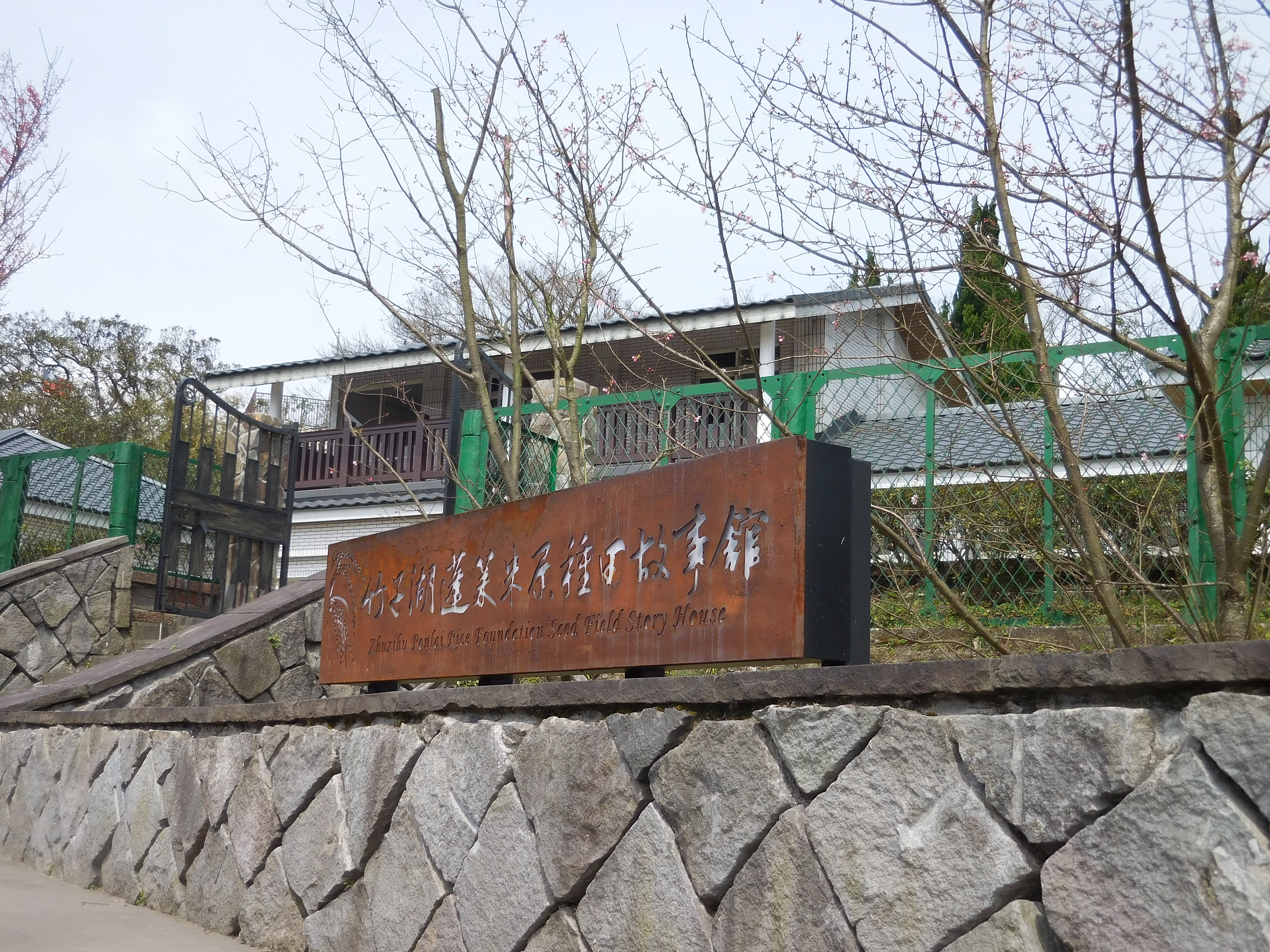
- Interactive map of the Zhuzihu Ponlai Rice Foundation Seed Field Story House area

General information
- Location: Beitou, Taipei, Taiwan
- Coordinates: 23°42′33″N 120°25′58″E
- Opened: 23 December 2015

The Zhuzihu Ponlai Rice Foundation Seed Field Story House (simplified Chinese: 竹子湖蓬莱米原种田故事馆; traditional Chinese: 竹子湖蓬萊米原種田故事館; pinyin: Zhúzihú Pénglái Mǐyuán Zhòngtián Gùshìguǎn) is a historic building in Beitou District, Taipei, Taiwan. The building is located within Yangmingshan National Park.

== History ==
=== Empire of Japan ===
The area where the building stands used to be the original rice field location to plant the Japonica rice in 1923 in which the harvested rice was called the Ponlai rice. Afterwards Zhuzihu Ponlai Rice Foundation Seed Field Office and Warehouse was established on 8 March 1928. The area was chosen because it was the operational center of farming management of Ponlai rice and also the center for seed bank, distribution and delivery of Ponlai rice and its related businesses.

=== Republic of China ===
The story house building was constructed after the handover of Taiwan from Japan to the Republic of China in 1945. In 1973 the office was closed and the building was reinforced twice and converted into the education center for leaders and training exercise of the Military Police of Ministry of National Defense and subsequently renamed to Plum Lotus Study Center.

The building was designated a historic building by Department of Cultural Affairs of Taipei City Government on 25 June 2009. In 2011, the building was handed over from the ministry to Yangmingshan National Park Headquarter. The park headquarter office then helped the design and planning for the establishment of the Zhuzihu Ponlai Rice Foundation Seed Field Story House to conserve the history of the local industry and to promote environmental education. The story house was opened on 23 December 2015 in a ceremony celebrated by lion dance performances played by Hutian Elementary School students.

== Exhibitions ==
The story houses consists of two pavilions, which are The Past and Present of Zhuzihu which introduces the history of local development and The Homeland of Taiwan Ponlai Rice which explains of the history of Ponlai rice origins in Zhuzihu.

== See also ==
- Agriculture in Taiwan
- List of museums in Taiwan
