= Fanlu =

Rural township in Chiayi County, Taiwan

Coordinates: 23.449365°N 120.603320°E

Fanlu Township 番路鄉
- Rural township
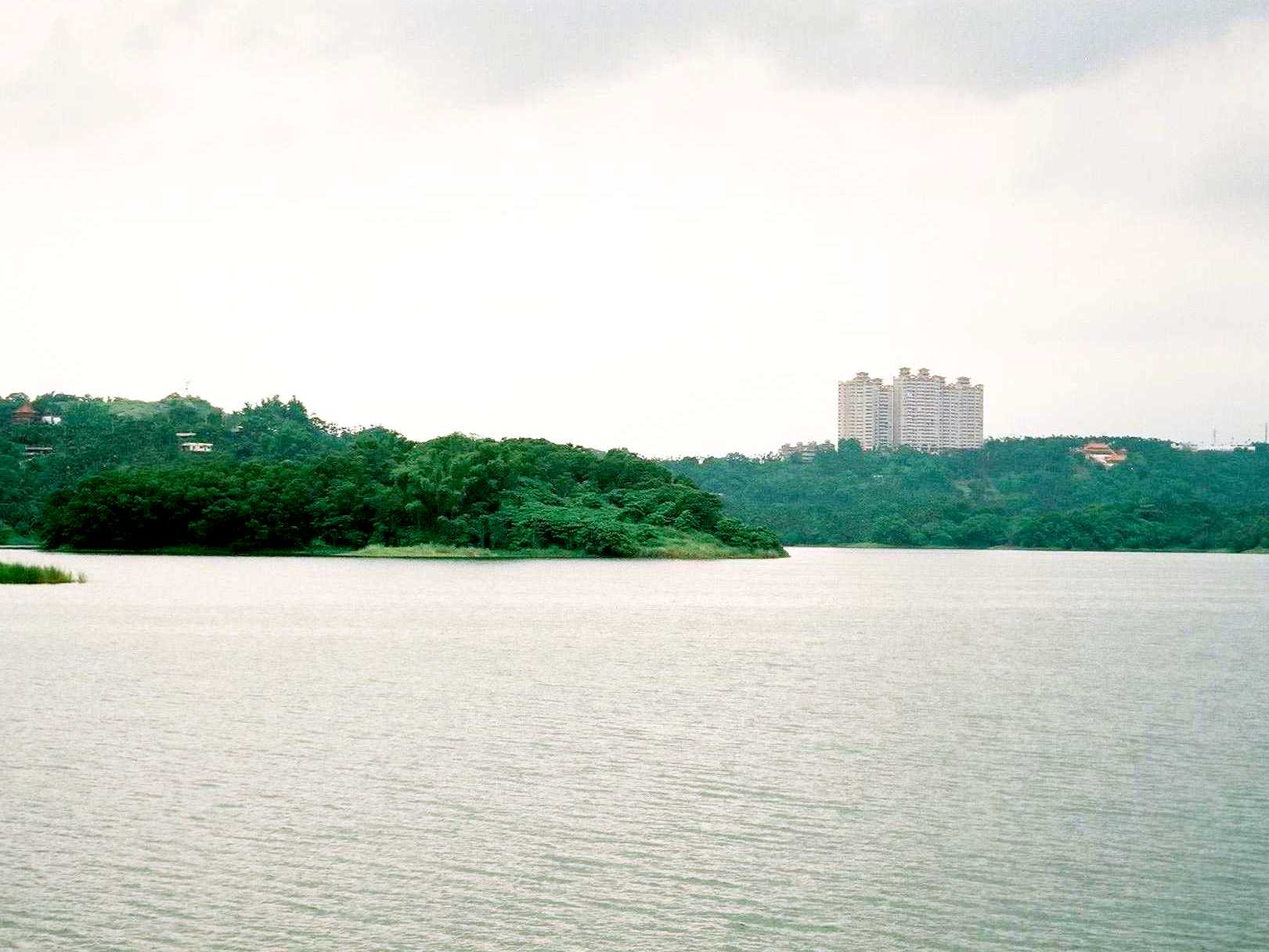
- Ren-Yi Tan Reservoir

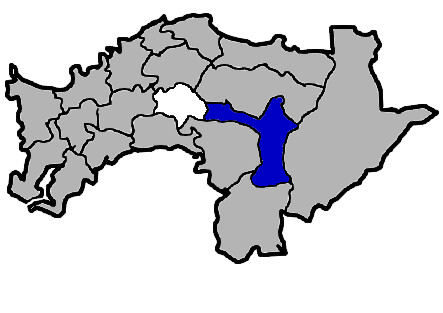
- Fanlu Township in Chiayi County
- Location: Chiayi County, Taiwan

Area
  - Total: 118 km^{2} (46 sq mi)

Population (May 2022)
  - Total: 11,029

Fanlu Township (Chinese: 番路鄉; pinyin: Fānlù Xiāng) is a rural township in Chiayi County, Taiwan.

== History ==
After the World War II in October 1945, the township became part of Tainan County. After readjustment in October 1950, the township became part of Chiayi County. In 1951, the township governs 11 villages and 112 neighborhoods.

== Administrative divisions ==
Jiangxi, Neiweng, Xinfu, Xiakeng, Panlu, Minhe, Chukou, Dahu, Gongtian, Gongxing and Caoshan Village.

== Geography ==
It has a population total of 11,029 and an area of 117.5269 km^{2}.

== Tourist attractions ==
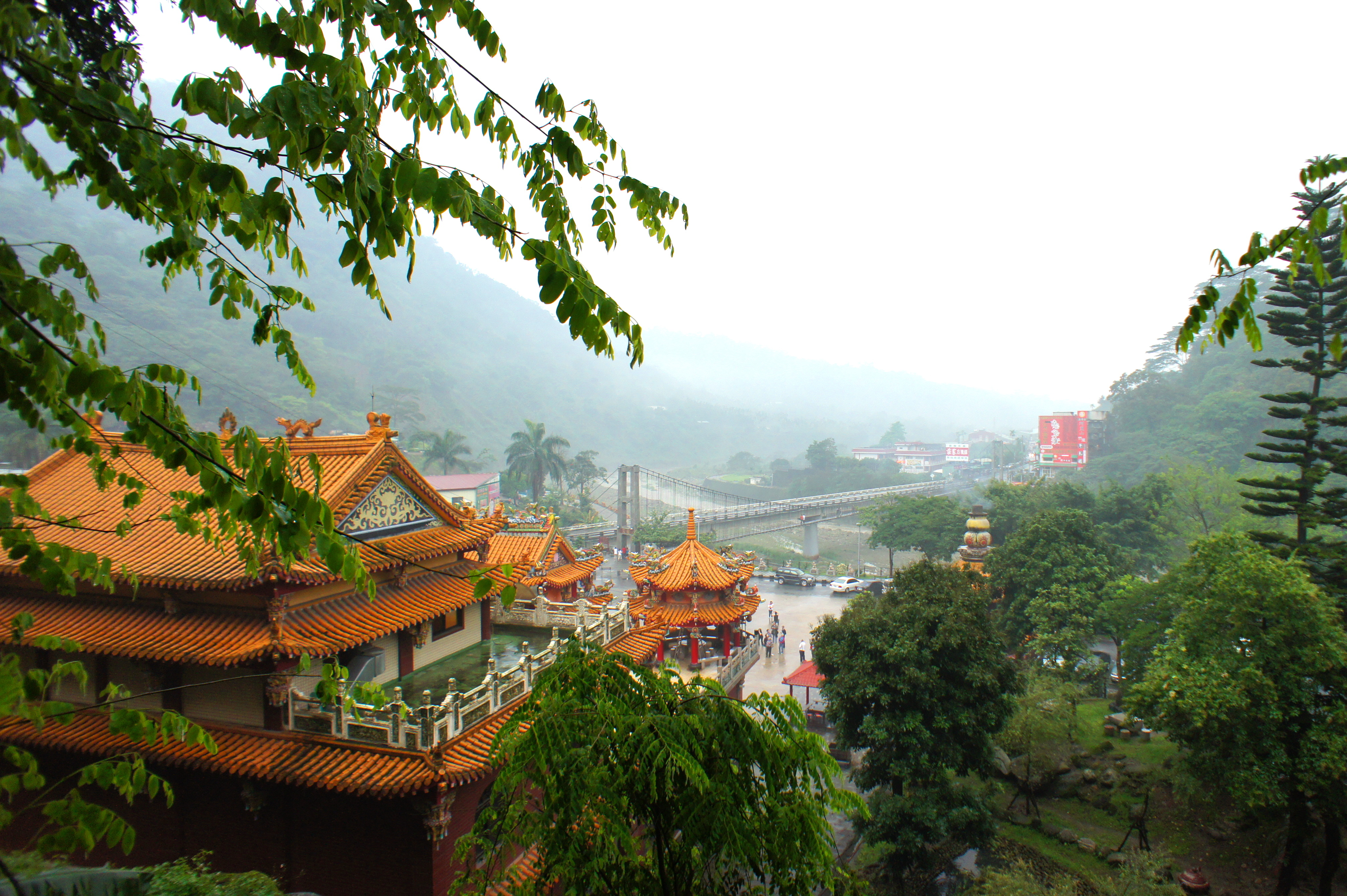
Longyin Temple, with the Dijiu Suspension Bridge in the background

- Bantianyan Ziyun Temple
- Chukou Nature Center
- Dijiu Suspension Bridge
- Fonghuang Waterfall
- Jioulongshan Temple
- Longyin Temple
- Renyitan Dam
- Syongdi Waterfall
- Tongnian Resort
- Yide Temple
