= Renyitan Dam =

Dam in Fanlu, Chiayi County, Taiwan

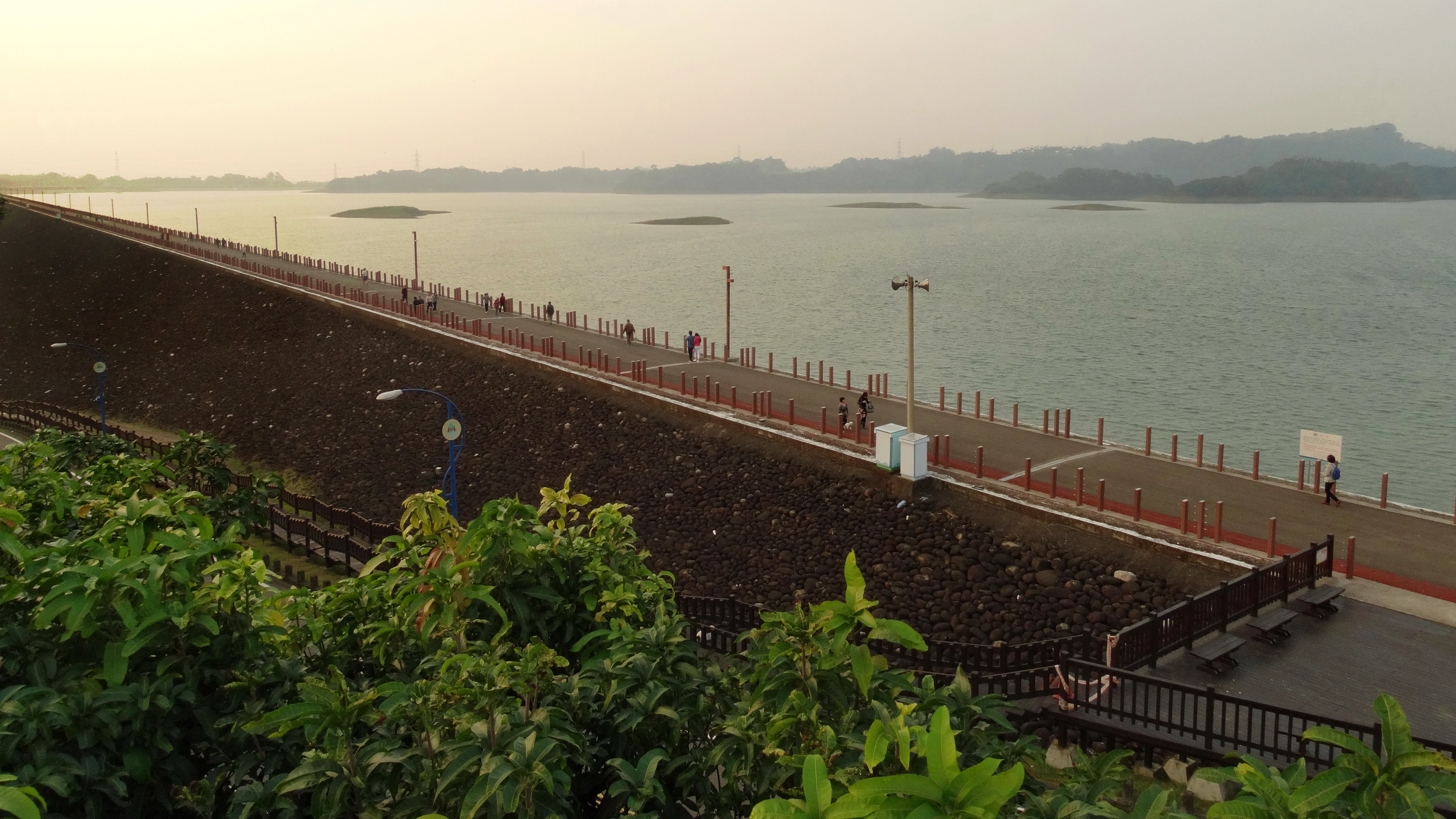

- Location within Chiayi County
- Official name: 仁義潭水壩
- Location: Fanlu, Chiayi County, Taiwan
- Coordinates: 23°27′39.6″N 120°30′8.1″E
- Status: Operational
- Construction began: April 1980; 46 years ago
- Opening date: October 1987; 38 years ago

Dam and spillways
- Type of dam: Embankment
- Height: 28 m (92 ft)
- Length: 1,535 m (5,036 ft)

Reservoir
- Total capacity: 29,110,000 m^{3}
- Active capacity: 27,310,000 m^{3}
- Surface area: 2.32 km^{2}
- Maximum water depth: 105 m

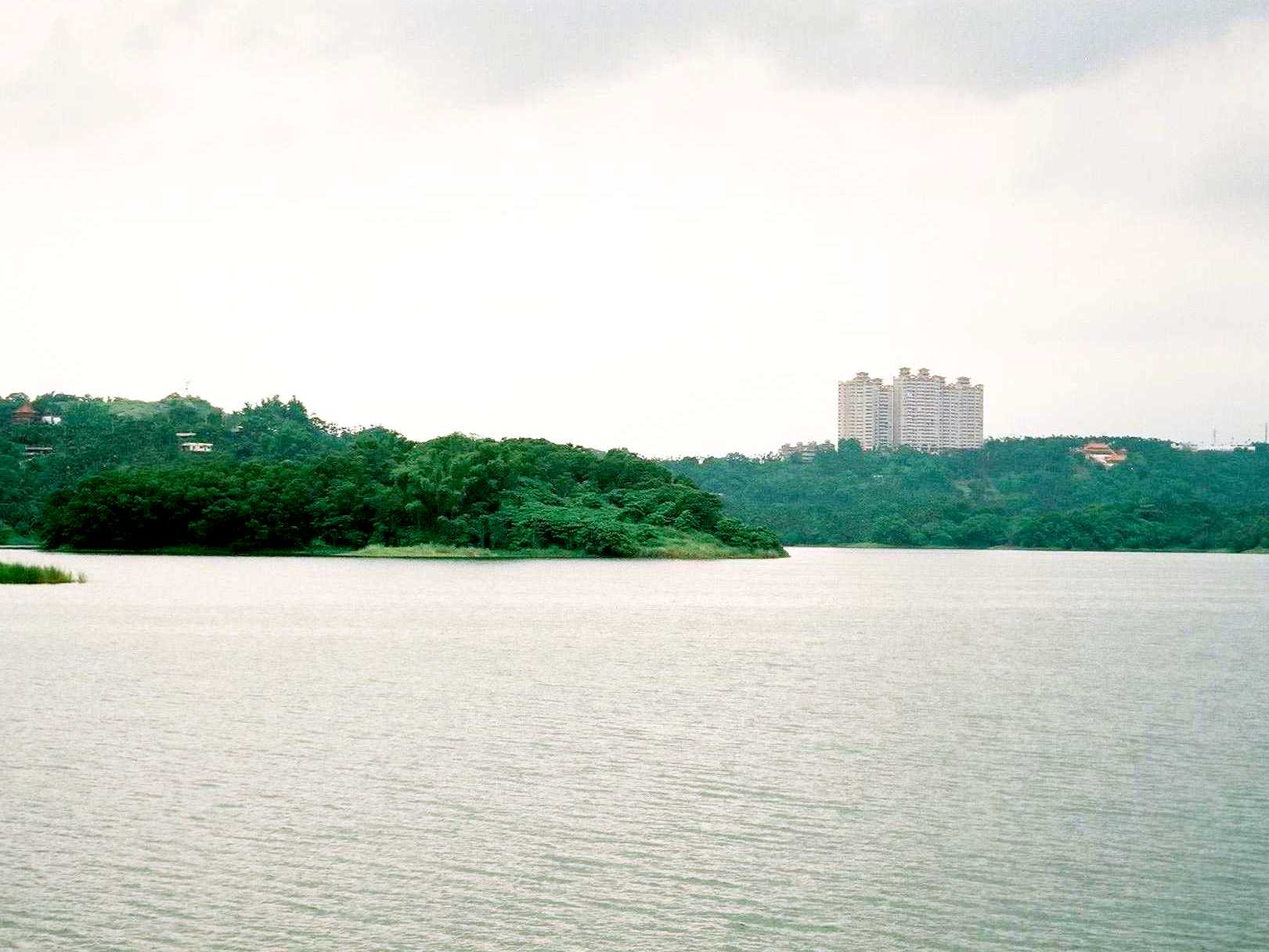
Renyitan Reservoir

The Renyitan Dam (traditional Chinese: 仁義潭水壩; simplified Chinese: 仁义潭水坝; pinyin: Rényìtán Shuǐbà) is a dam in Fanlu Township, Chiayi County, Taiwan.

== History ==
The dam was initially constructed in April 1980 on Renyi Lake and was opened in October 1987.

== Technical specifications ==
The water intake for the reservoir inside the dam comes from Bazhang River. The reservoir has a full capacity of 29,110,000 m^{3} and an effective capacity of 27,310,000 m^{3}. The reservoir maximum surface area is 2.32 km^{2} with a maximum depth of 105 m.

== Transportation ==
The dam is accessible east from Chiayi Station of Taiwan Railway.

== See also ==
- List of dams and reservoirs in Taiwan
