= Agriculture in Taiwan =

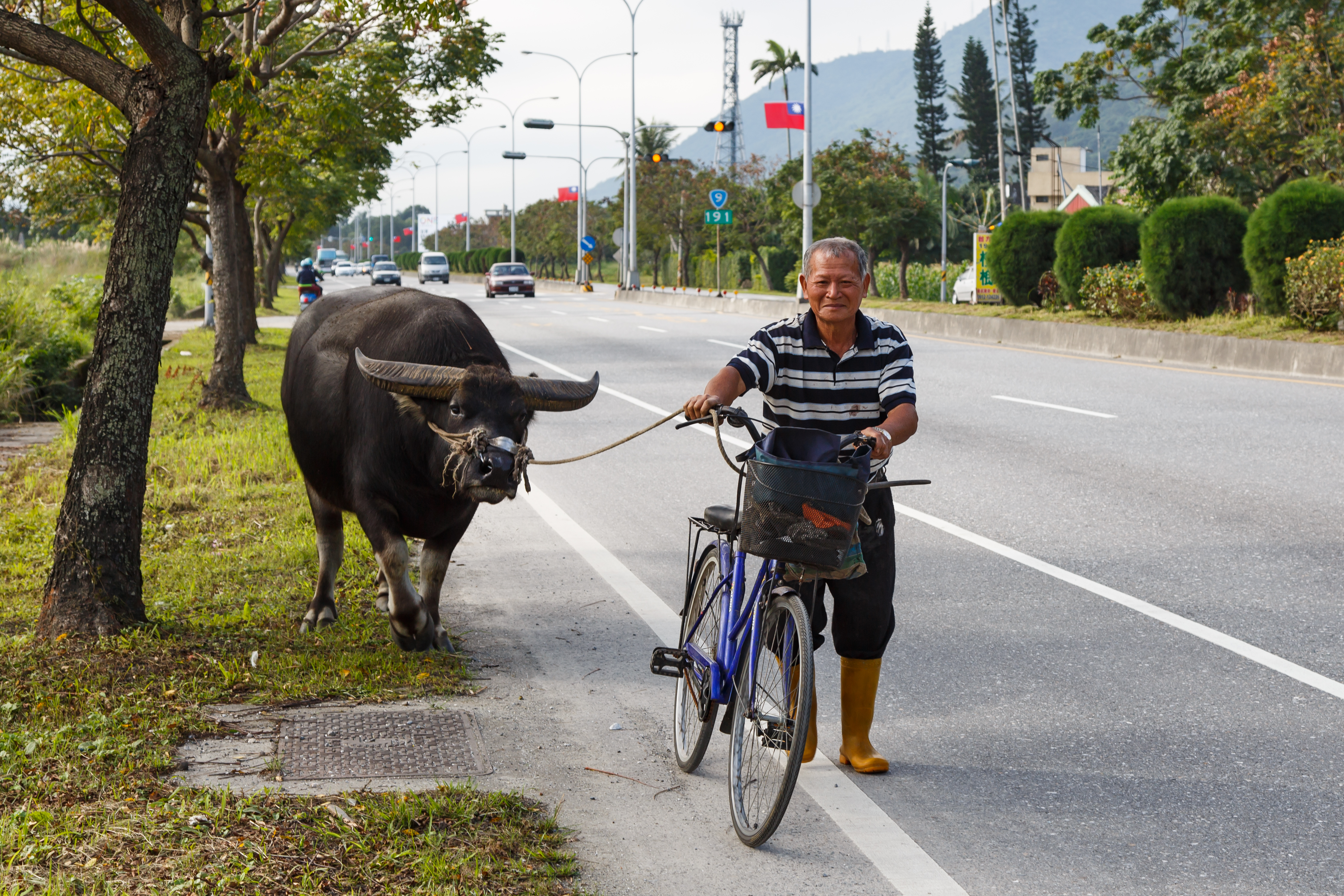
A farmer in Taiwan

Agriculture is one of the main industries in Taiwan. It contributes to the food security, rural development and conservation of Taiwan. Around 24% of Taiwan's land is used for farming.

Taiwan is a global leader in vertical farming and agritourism.

== History ==
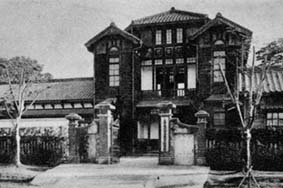
Chiayi School of Agriculture and Forest in Tainan Prefecture

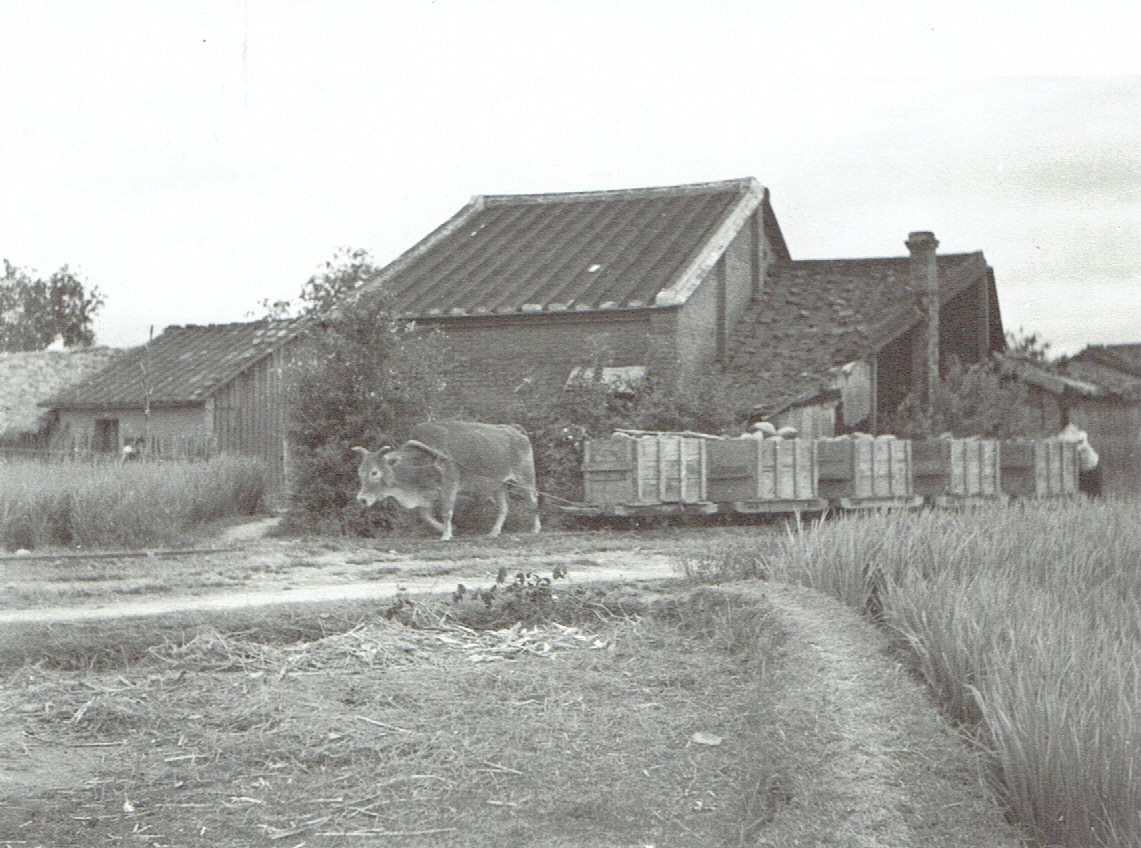
A cattle-man powered push-pull narrow gauge train in rural Taiwan (1930s)

=== Prehistory ===
Agriculture has been an important sector of Taiwanese life since ages ago. From archaeological sites in Changbin Township, Taitung County, since Paleolithic Age around 30,000-50,000 years ago, people hunted, fished and gathered. Only in the Neolithic Age around 5,000-2,000 years ago, did people began to live their sedentary lifestyle where they grew rice and other crops and domesticated animals. During the Iron Age around 2,000 years ago, people in the northern coast of Taiwan began to make iron tools and food production increased significantly. In the 17th century, people from China began to migrate to Taiwan where they fished, hunted and grew crops. Most of them settled in the area around Tainan.

=== Dutch Formosa ===
In the 1600s, the Dutch established the sugarcane industry in southern Taiwan. At that time, 119 km^{2} of cultivated land in Taiwan belonged to the Dutch East India Company. The Dutch exported Taiwan's agricultural products and imported peas, tomatoes, wax apples and mangoes from Southeast Asia and United States to Taiwan.

The Dutch introduced the domestic turkey to Taiwan.

=== Ming Dynasty ===
During the rule of Koxinga in the Kingdom of Tungning in the late 17th century, the number of immigrants from China to Taiwan increased to 200,000 people. This resulted in the increase of land under cultivation to 292 km^{2}. Koxinga established a land tenure system and taught people to build reservoirs for irrigation. Rice was the main produce at that time. Chinese people also brought 43 kinds of vegetable from South China, such as leeks, garlic and Chinese cabbage.

=== Qing Dynasty ===
During the Qing Dynasty, immigration from Mainland China to Taiwan increased because of wars and famines in the mainland. People began to build canals for irrigation. At this time, the cultivated land in Taiwan increased to 3,506 km^{2} by 1895.

The eighteen century official Chiang Yun-chuan was responsible for significant improvements in irrigation and flood control in southern Taiwan and was incorporated into the local folk religion as a deity.

=== Empire of Japan ===
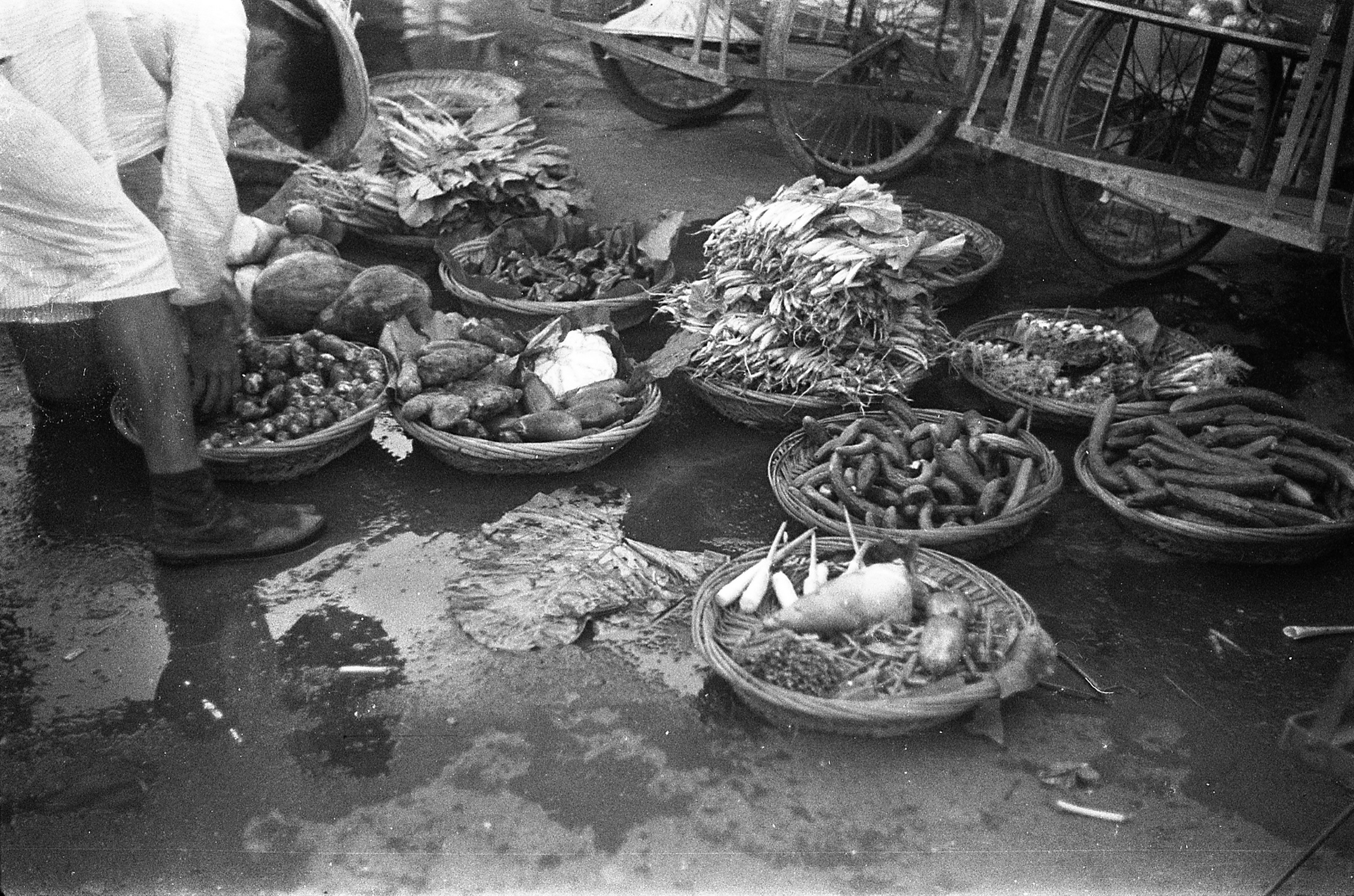
At a Fruit and Vegetable Market in Taihoku 1938-1942

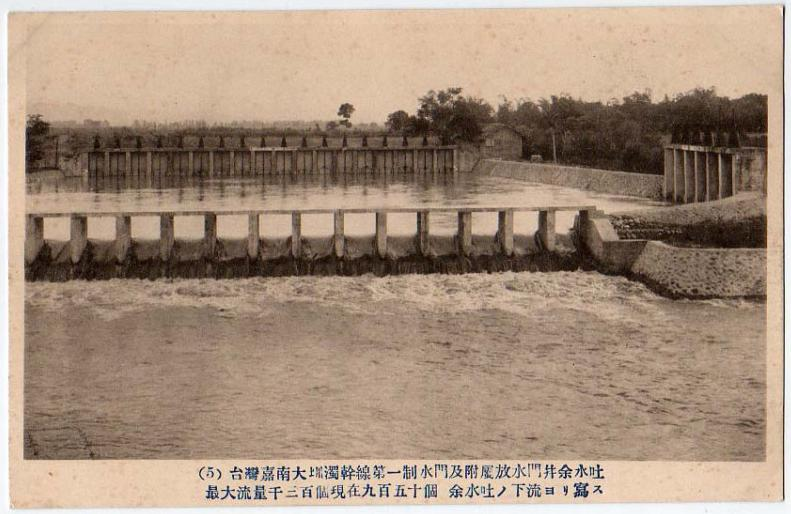
Chianan Irrigation dam during the Japanese period

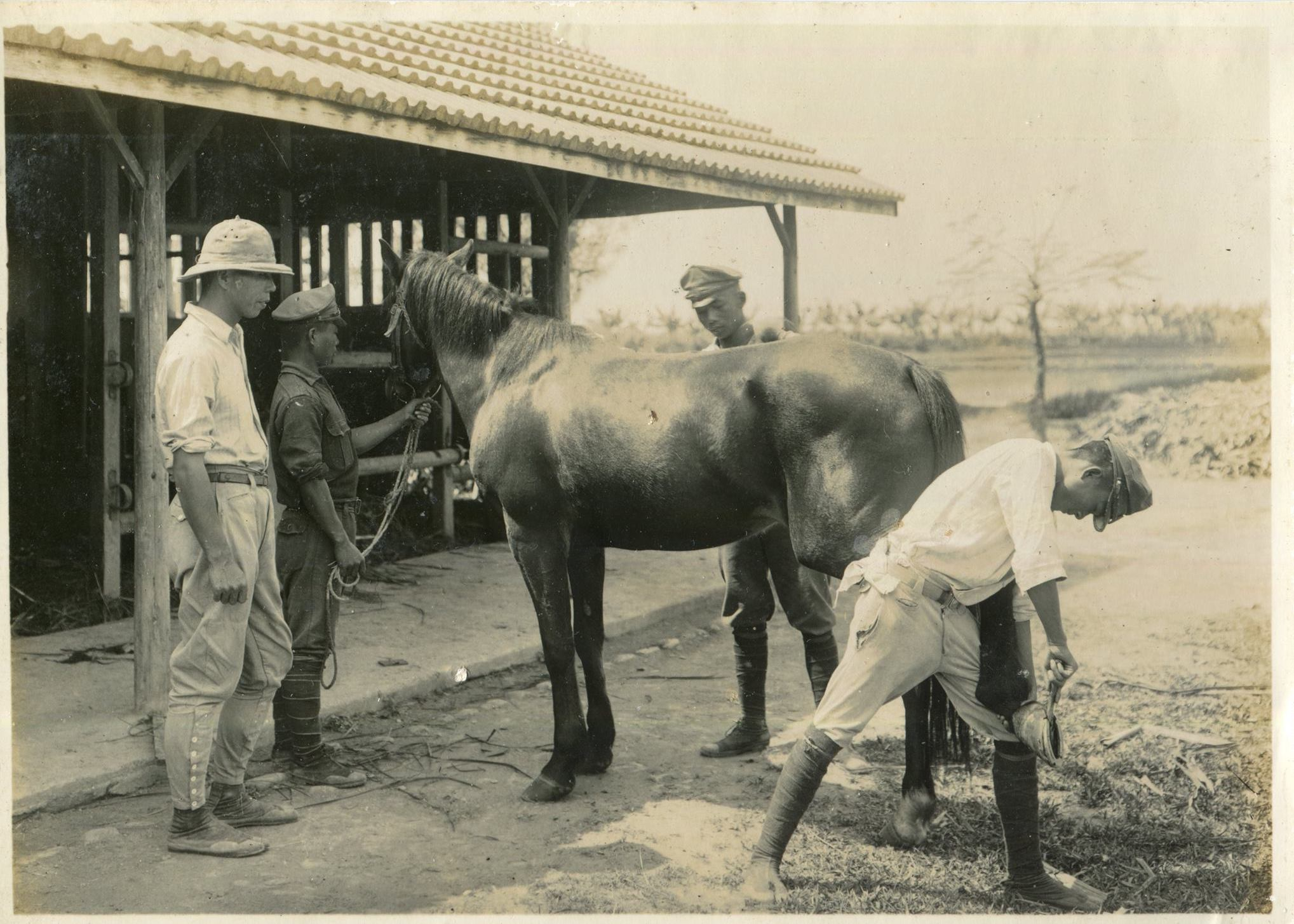
Service activity in the Heitō Secondary School between 1938 and 1945

During the Empire of Japan, the Japanese greatly improved the agriculture sectors in Taiwan. They built concrete dams, reservoirs and aqueducts which forms an extensive irrigation system, such as the Chianan Irrigation. Arable land for rice and sugarcane productions increased by more than 74% and 30% respectively. They also established farmers' associations. Agriculture sector dominated the economy of Taiwan at that time. In 1904, 23% area of Taiwan was used as agricultural land.

The Taiwan Agricultural Research institute (TARI) was founded in 1895 by the Japanese colonial powers.

By 1939 Taiwan was the third largest exporter of bananas and canned pineapple in the world.

=== Republic of China ===
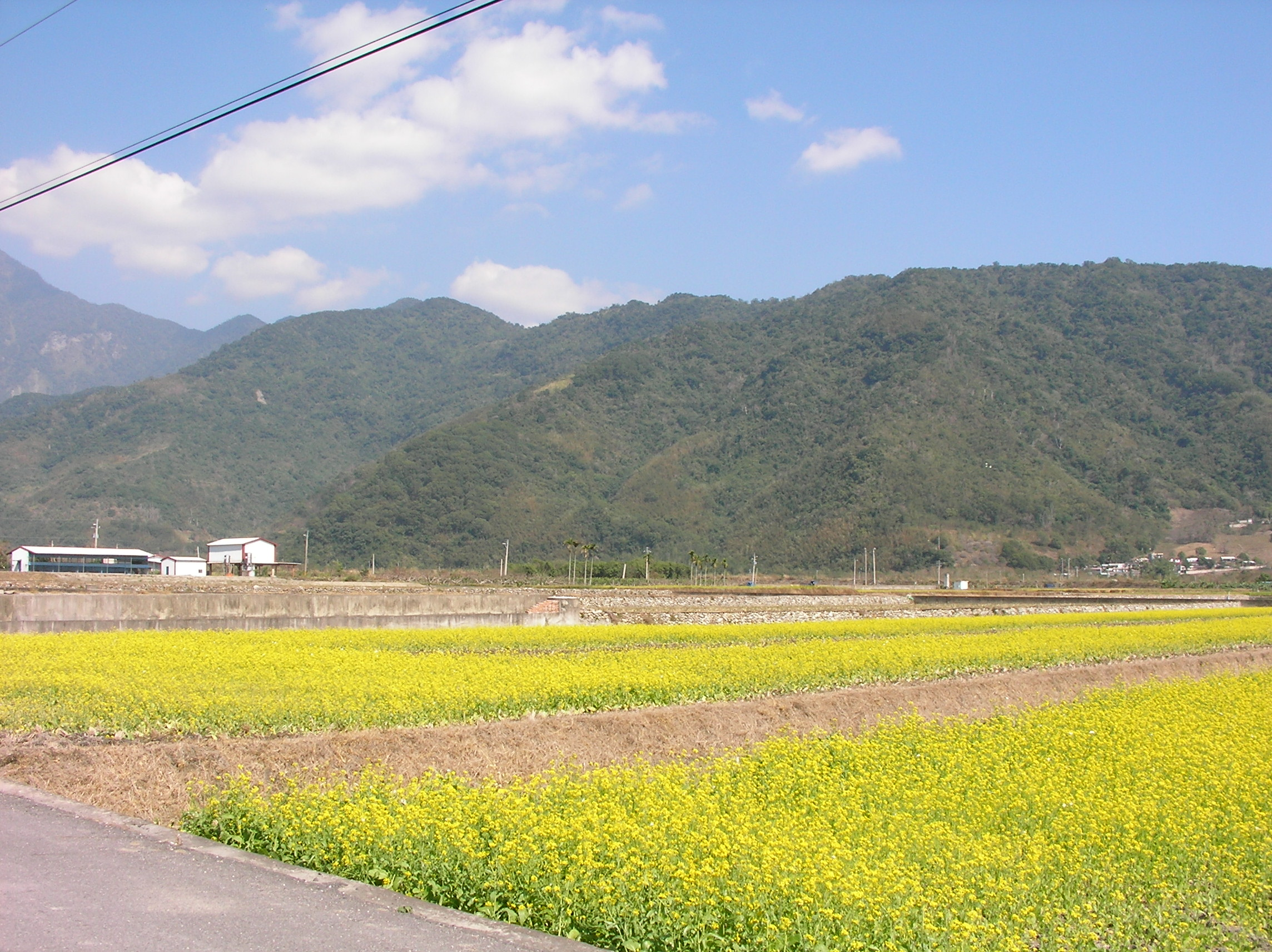
Rapeseed fields

After the handover of Taiwan from Japan to the Republic of China in 1945, the government revitalized the agricultural sector first to recover from the damage caused by World War II and completed a full recovery by 1953.

In the early 1950s, agriculture was Taiwan's largest economic sector and the vast majority of Taiwanese were farmers.

The government extended agricultural facilities and introduced the land reform program under the Sino-American Joint Commission on Rural Reconstruction. By 1956, agricultural land accounted for 34% of Taiwan's land use. In 1958, horticulturalist Cheng Chao-hsiung launched an experimental farm for deciduous fruit in the Central Mountain Range. Aided by veterans of the Chinese Civil War moving to the region, larger scale production of apples, peaches and plums began the following decade and continued to 1979.

In the late 1940s, Taiwan underwent high-speed economic growth and industrialization. In 1963, industrial sectors output value exceeded agricultural sectors output value. Also in the 1960s, the government shifted their priority to the development of export-oriented economic policy which focused on labor-intensive industries, such as textiles, convenience food and consumer electronics which eventually made Taiwan part of the Four Asian Tigers, along with British Hong Kong, Singapore and South Korea. However, this caused pressure on the agricultural sector as more and more people moved away from rural areas and labor costs increased.

In the 1970s, the role of agriculture shifted from the primary focus of the economy to a supporting role. The government at that time issued policies for farmers to grow organic crops. In the 1980s, much farmland was left idle due to the emigration of people from rural to urban areas as well as Taiwan beginning to open up to staple food imports. On 1 January 2002, Taiwan joined the World Trade Organization under the name Separate Customs Territory of Taiwan, Penghu, Kinmen and Matsu. This accession caused further damage to the agricultural sector in Taiwan. In response, the government has promoted agricultural tourism.

President Lee Teng-hui believed that agriculture was the backbone of a nation and promoted it extensively. He implemented health insurance and occupational hazard insurance programs for farmers. He also emphasized the Japanese roots of much of Taiwan's agricultural infrastructure.

While the importance of agriculture to the Taiwanese economy has declined greatly from its heyday Taiwan has become a global leader in the vertical farming industry. Due to their efficient development of vertical farming technology and know-how Taiwanese firms are often partnered with by international firms looking to start vertical farming ventures in their home countries. The vertical farming industry benefits from the high concentration of LED, robotics, engineering, and data processing firms in Taiwan. Vertical farms in Taiwan primarily compete with imported produce and focus on producing premium vegetables as their products remain more expensive than those from Taiwan's traditional farms.

Recently, the government has introduced new policy to reactivate all of the remaining idle farmland to ensure food security, food self-sufficiency and to revitalize the agriculture sectors. Policies to develop the sector to be more competitive, modern and green were also introduced. This has led to a large number of urban youth taking up farming. Since 2009 the Agriculture Council has subsidized education and training for new farmers, most of whom already hold advanced degrees.

In 2020 the Taiwanese government's Council of Agriculture set aside NT$5 billion (US$166.21 million) in loans for produce, livestock and aquaculture operations as well as other agriculture-based enterprises effected by the COVID-19 pandemic. The loans are at a preferential rate of 0.79 percent to 1.68 percent.

In 2021 the Taiwanese government began incentivizing rice farmers to diversify their production beyond the staple crop.

Taiwan's agriculture industry now satisfies 90% of its domestic demand, making it a model of self-sufficiency.

== Government ==
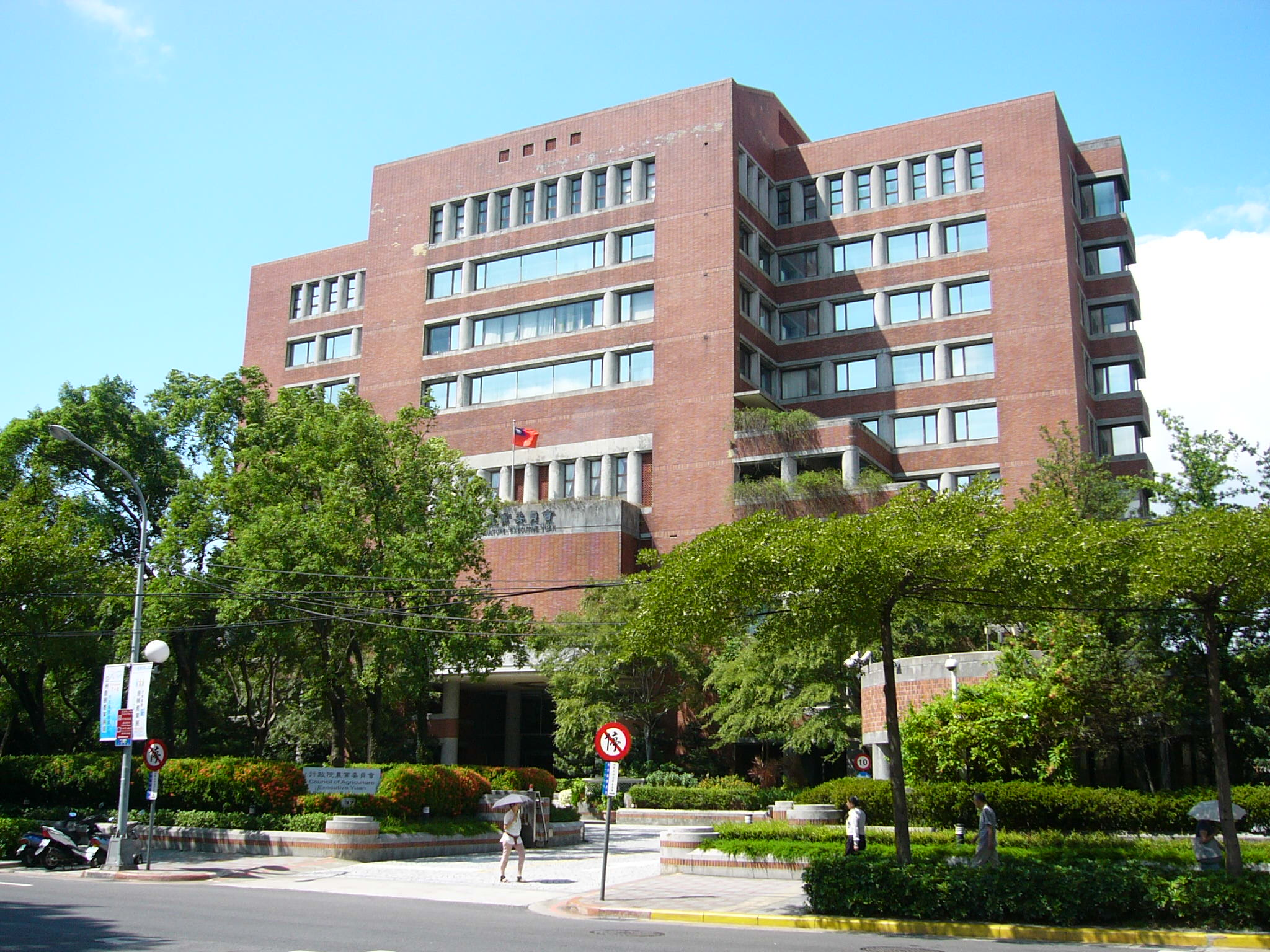
Ministry of Agriculture in Taipei

Agriculture-related affairs in Taiwan are handled by the Ministry of Agriculture (MOA), headed by Minister Chen Junne-jih, and its division Agriculture and Food Agency. Taiwan houses the headquarters of the World Vegetable Center. Taiwan is also a member of world organizations related to agriculture, such as the African-Asian Rural Development Organization, Asia-Pacific Economic Cooperation, International Commission for the Conservation of Atlantic Tunas and World Trade Organization.

== Produce ==
Agriculture in Taiwan consists of four sectors, with crops (47.39%), livestock (37%), fishery (15.58%) and forestry (0.03%) accounting for total agricultural output of NT$580 billion in 2023.

=== Rice ===
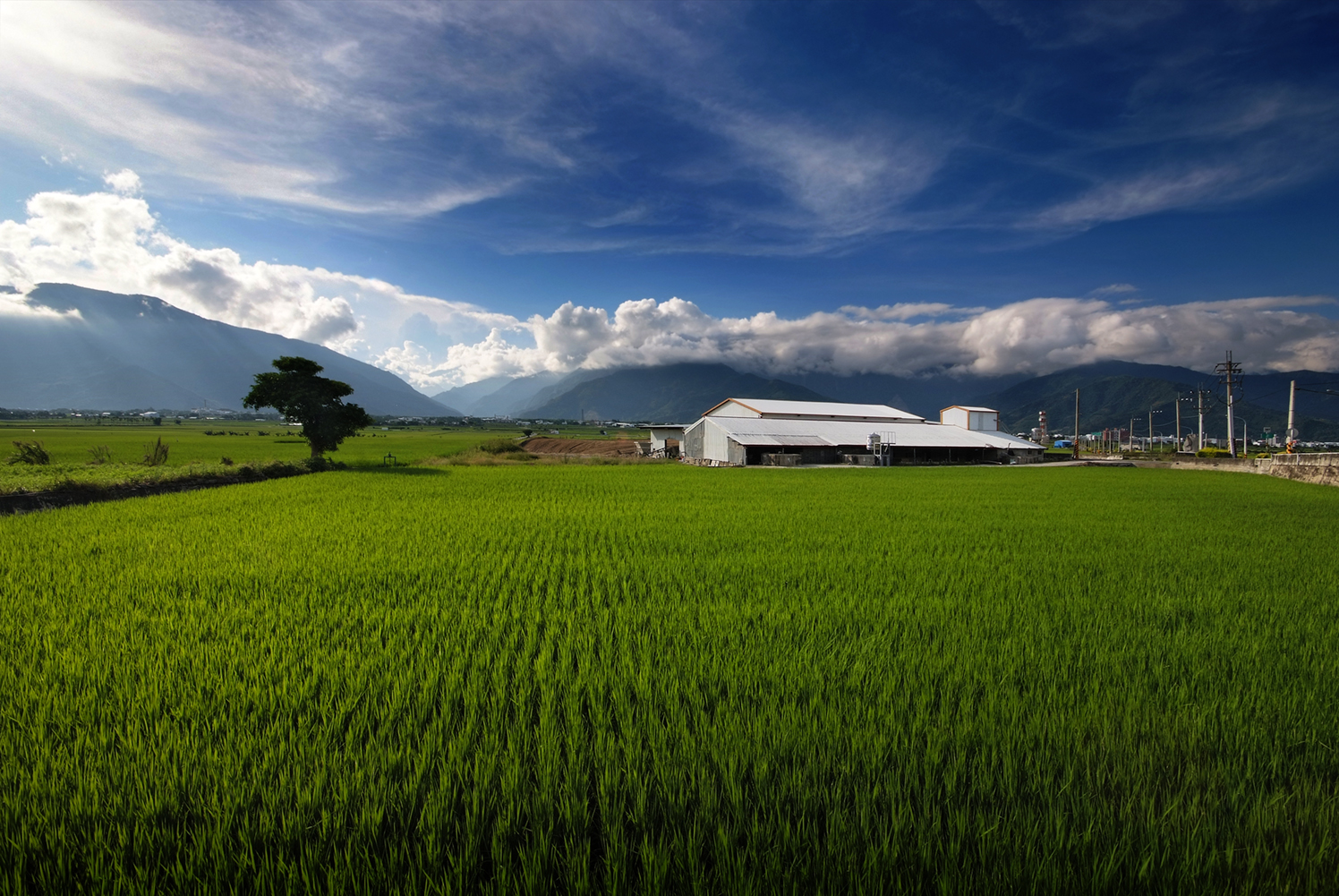
Paddy field in Hualien County

In 2023, Taiwan harvested 1.46 million tons of paddy rice from 222,413 hectares of land, for a yield of 6,566 kg per hectare and a total value of NT$34.9 billion. It is the most important cash crop in Taiwan. The quality of Taiwanese rice is extremely high.

Before the Japanese colonial period, most rice grown in Taiwan was long-grained Indica rice. The Japanese introduced short-grained Japonica into Taiwan, which quickly changed both the farming and eating patterns of the Taiwanese.

=== Betel nuts ===
In 2023, Taiwan harvested 92,467 tonnes of betel nuts from 37,293 hectares of land, the second most valuable cash crop after rice.

=== Cocoa ===
Cocoa cultivation on Taiwan began during the Japanese period but support ended after World War II. The next wave of cultivation occurred in the 1970s but petered out because farmers lacked the expertise necessary to process the raw beans. The modern industry was kickstarted by Chiu Ming-sung, a betel nut farmer and chocolatier from Pingtung who in 2007 became the first in Taiwan to make tree-to-bar chocolate. Taiwan's cocoa production is centered in Pingtung in Southern Taiwan. Because of high production costs and small farm size, Taiwanese cocoa producers focus on producing estate-grade beans. In Pingtung county cocoa is generally grown as a companion crop to betel nut as the tall betel nut palms shade the cocoa plants. As of 2020 approximately 200-300 acres was under cultivation in Pingtung supporting around 30 chocolate making companies.

==== Chocolate industry ====
The cocoa industry supports a significant domestic cocoa processing and chocolate making industry. Taiwan is one of the few mature chocolate making countries to also be a cocoa producer. In 2021 Taiwan tightened the labelling regulations for chocolate.

=== Coffee ===
The first coffee plants on Taiwan were imported by the British to Tainan in 1884 with the first significant small scale cultivation taking place in New Taipei City's Sanxia District. Tainan remains the heart of Taiwanese coffee culture.

Commercial coffee production in Taiwan began during the Japanese colonial period. The Japanese developed the industry to feed the export market. Production reached a peak in 1941 following the introduction of arabica coffee plants. Production declined shortly thereafter as a result of World War II. Domestic production is small—at 856 tons in 2023—but of high quality. Imported beans account for the vast majority of coffee sold in Taiwan.

The coffee borer beetle is a significant pest in Taiwan.

Tainung No. 1 is the first popular domestically bred coffee cultivar. It can be grown at lower altitudes than most coffee varieties and produces excellent quality beans.

=== Fruits ===
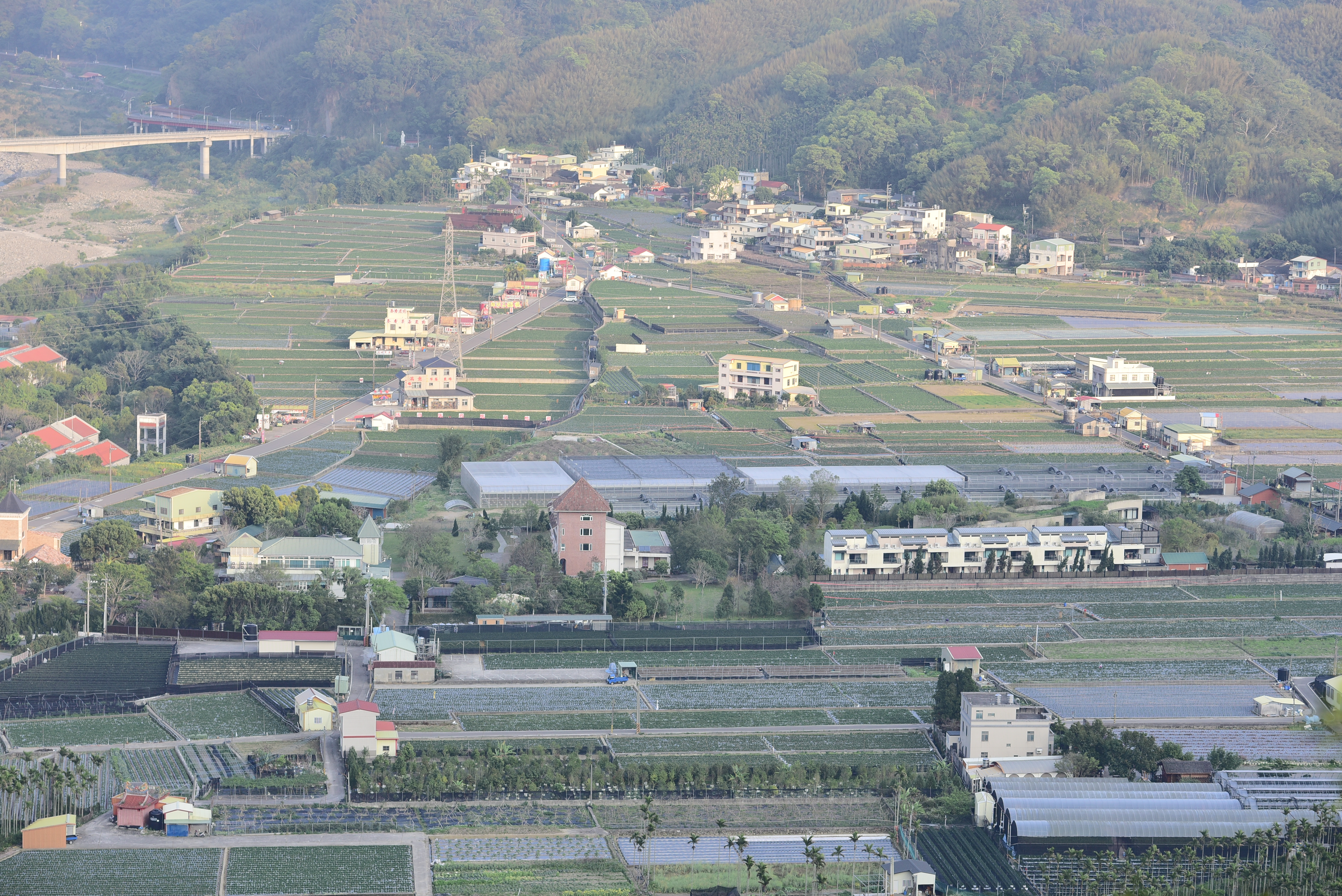
Strawberry farms in Dahu Township

In 2023, Taiwan harvested 2.4 million tonnes of fruits from 173,766 hectares of land with a total value of NT$95.8 billion. Taiwan's fruit crops include banana, grape, guava, jujube, lychee, mandarin orange, mango, orange, papaya, pineapple, pomelo, sand pear, dragon fruit, starfruit, strawberry, watermelon and wax apple. The annual fruits export is 60,000 tons with a value of NT$3,452 million. In 2018 the largest export market of Taiwanese fruits was China. In 2022 the largest export market of Taiwanese fruits was Japan.

==== Avocados ====
Most avocado varieties grown in Taiwan produce large fruit. Domestic avocados compete with imported American hass avocados in the local market. Cultivation grew from 506 hectares in 2011 to 1,149 hectares in 2020 due to rising popularity.

==== Bananas ====
Bananas are Taiwan's most important export fruit. The Taiwan Banana Research Institute is tasked to undergo research and development of banana cultivation in Taiwan.

==== Citrus ====
By 1984 there were 34,000 hectares of citrus orchards in Taiwan annual yields of 360,000 metric tons with mandarin oranges and tangerines leading in production. In 2008 a glut in orange production forced the export of surplus fruit to China. President Ma Ying-jeou even personally contributing $80,000 NTD to support an orchard in Gukeng township in Yunlin County as a result of the glut.

The average pomelo harvest is 74,000 tonnes. Pomelos are exported to China and Japan. Tainan is a major pomelo growing area. Greenpeace has warned that global warming could negatively impact Taiwanese pomelo production.

In 2018 there were 2,737 hectares of lemons in cultivation with 1,820 of those located in Pingtung County.

Taiwan produces a small amount of Australian finger lime.

In 2022 China blocked the importation of Taiwanese citrus due to tensions over the 2022 visit by Nancy Pelosi to Taiwan. This affected the pomelo industry in particular due to the ban's timing and its exposure to the Chinese market.

==== Custard apples ====
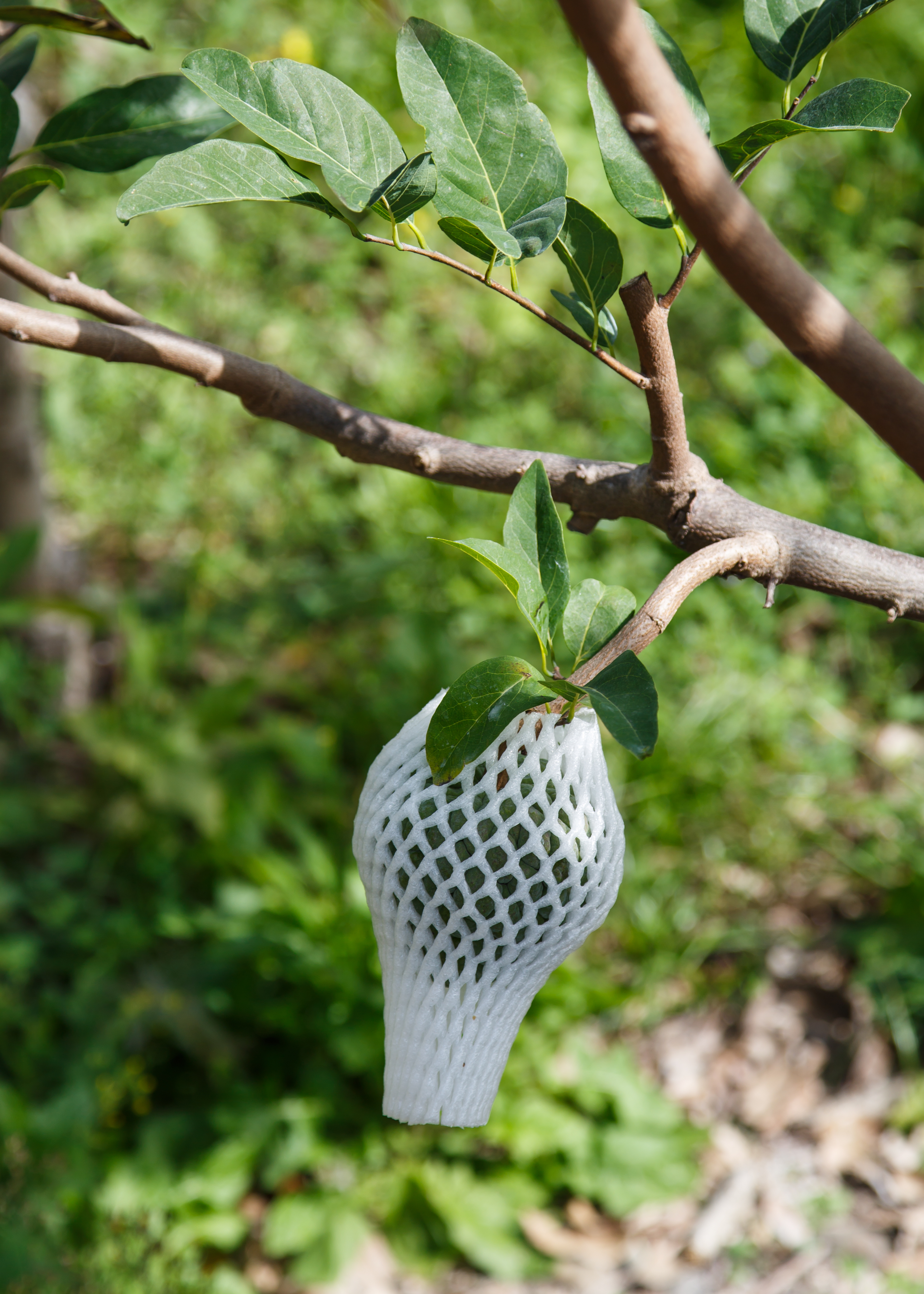
A cherimoya fruit, growing in a protective cover on a plantation in Bin Lang Village, Taiwan

Production of custard apples in concentrated in Taitung County, Kaohsiung, and Pingtung County. Annual production is 57,000 metric tons. Historically, 23% of production was exported to China, but Chinese authorities banned new imports of Taiwanese custard apples in 2021.

==== Dragonfruit ====
Pingtung is the center of dragonfruit cultivation which is known locally as pitaya. Academic Yen Chung-Ruey is known as Taiwan's “Father of Pitaya.” Most of the production is consumed domestically but dragonfruit are also exported to Canada, China and Hong Kong.

==== Guavas ====
Guavas are a significant product with a little over half of exports going to Canada, in 2019 Taiwan received permission to export guavas to the United States for the first time.

==== Mangos ====
Mangos have been cultivated in Taiwan for more than 400 years. For the last fifty years the market has been dominated by the Irwin mango. The Irwin mango was first grown in Taiwan in 1962 by Cheng Han-chih (鄭罕池) in Douliuzai Village, Yujing District, Tainan. In 1973 the government designated Douliuzai Village as a mango special agricultural zone. By the 1970s the residents of Douliuzai Village were known for their wealth due to mango cultivation. Cheng Han-chih is considered to be the godfather of the lucrative modern mango industry. The traditional variety of mango, known as the “native mango” (土芒果), is smaller and more fibrous than modern varieties due to this they are often pickled or candied.

==== Papaya ====
The papaya cultivar Papaya No. 7 is a significant cash crop in Pingtung.

==== Pineapples ====
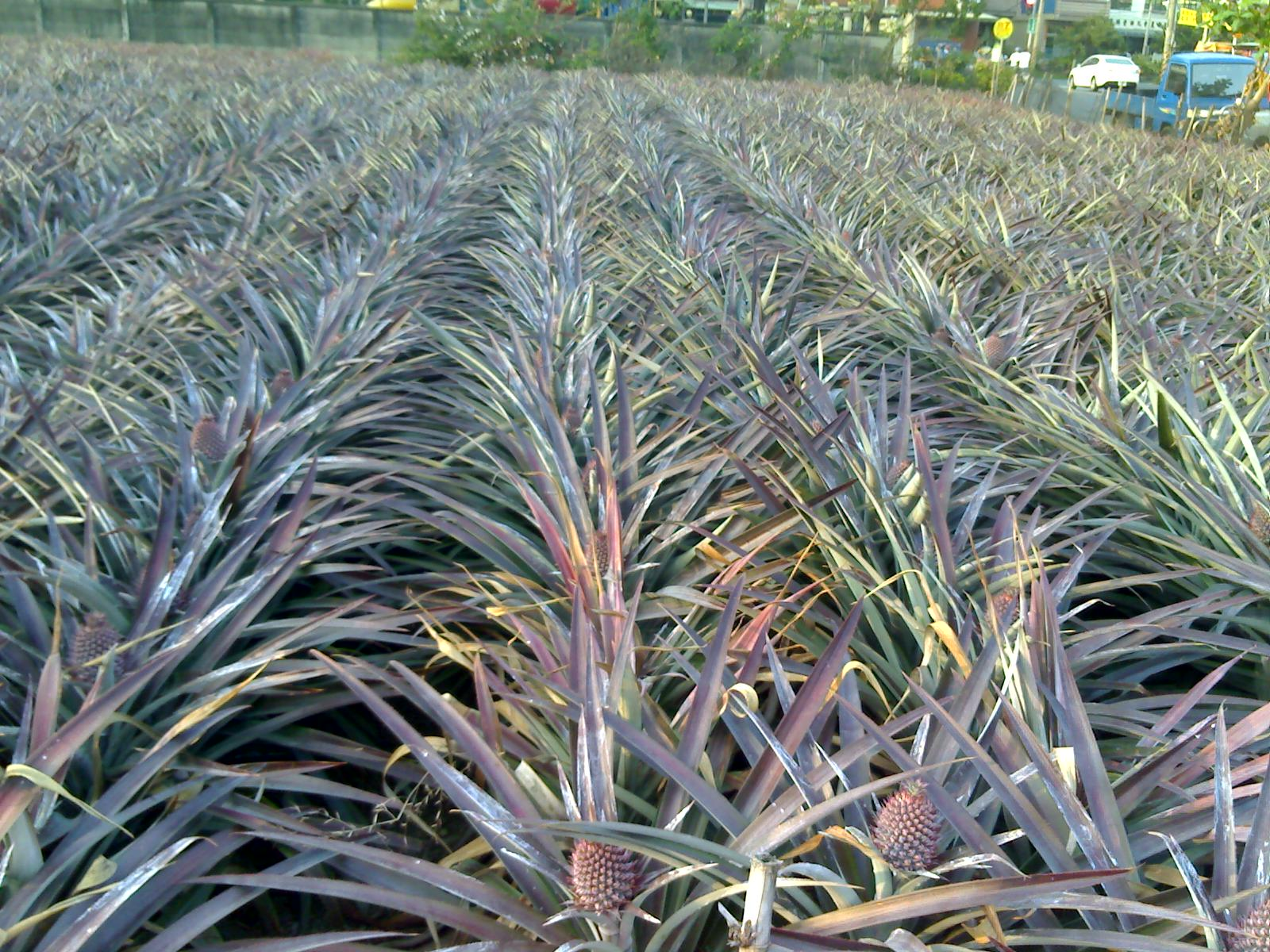
Pineapple plantation at Jiaochitang

Taiwan is a significant producer of pineapples, with production primarily occurring in Pingtung and other southern regions. Pineapples make up 40% of Taiwan's fruit exports by value.

In 2021 China banned the importation of pineapples from Taiwan just as the season was beginning claiming that previous imports had been contaminated with pests, claims questioned or denied by experts, producers, and the Taiwanese government. In response to the ban the Taiwanese government asked the Taiwanese people and diplomatic allies to increase their consumption of Taiwan's “Freedom Pineapples” and promised financial assistance to any farmers who saw losses as a result of the ban. The “Freedom Pineapples” initiative received support from allies such as Canada and the United States with the Canadians referencing the Canadian invention pineapple pizza. The Freedom Pineapple campaign was launched by Foreign Minister Joseph Wu on Twitter.

==== Lychee ====
Lychee production is significant with more than 3,000 hectares under cultivation in Kaohsiung alone. The two main varieties are Heiyezi and Yuhebao. Production was reduced in 2021 due to drought.

==== Viticulture and winemaking ====
Independent winemaking was illegal in Taiwan for a long time due to the monopoly granted to the Taiwan Tobacco and Liquor Corporation. Taiwan Tobacco and Liquor Corporation produced just one wine, a rosé. With liberalization following the end of military rule independent winemakers became legal in 2002 and in 2014 a Taiwanese wine won its first gold medal at an international competition. The primary grapes cultivated for winemaking in Taiwan are Black Queen and Golden Muscat which were both introduced to the country in the 1950s. A red wine from Taichung was awarded a gold medal at the 25th Vinalies Internationales in France. In 2020 Taiwanese wines won two gold medals at the 26th Vinalies Internationales Competition. Grape harvest in Taiwan is dictated by the typhoon season which means growers are sometimes forced to pick less than ripe fruit. Two of the most acclaimed wineries are Domaine Shu Sheng and Weightstone Vineyard Estate & Winery. The relative rarity and high quality of Taiwanese wines makes them particularly prized by Hong Kong collectors. Although it was once largely lost Taiwan's indigenous winemaking culture is staging a comeback.

==== Wax apples ====
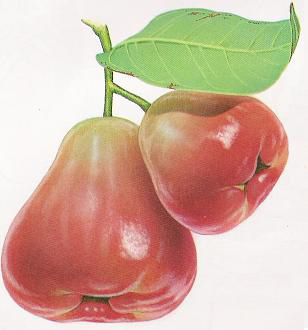
Black Pearl wax apple

Wax apples are a significant crop in Taiwan. Taiwanese researchers have bred firmer, larger, and more deeply red varieties of the wax apple to appeal to the local market and growing conditions. This has led some to inaccurately believe that wax apples themselves were invented in Taiwan. The variety Black Pearl is highly valued.

Production of wax apples in concentrated in Taitung County, Kaohsiung, and Pingtung County. Annual production is 47,000 metric tons. Historically, 10% of production was exported to China, but Chinese authorities banned new imports of Taiwanese wax apples in 2021. Pingtung's southern coast is particularly productive for wax apples as the trees perform favorably in slightly saline conditions.

==== Indian jujube ====
Indian jujube production in Taiwan is significant. Productions is centered in Kaohsiung with 750 hectares, 40% of the national total, of Indian jujubes. The annual production value is 1b NTD.

==== Persimmon ====
Persimmon growing in Taiwan peaked at 5,300 hectares but declined to 4,700 hectares by 2024 largely due to the impacts of typhoons and climate change on production. Most Taiwanese persimmons are consumed domestically with dried persimmons especially favored.

==== Strawberries ====
The most commonly cultivated strawberry variety in Taiwan is the Taoyuan No. 1 (桃園1號).

=== Mushrooms ===
Wild mushrooms and fungus were widely consumed by the indigenous people of Taiwan as well as being used for medicinal and spiritual purposes. Commercial mushroom farming on Taiwan can be traced to methods introduced during the Japanese period. The industry took off in the 1950s after being targeted by the U.S.-ROC Joint Commission on Rural Reconstruction (JCRR) for development. Exports of canned mushrooms began in 1960 and by 1963 Taiwan was the world's top mushroom exporter with a third of the global market. Exports of canned mushrooms peaked in 1978 before declining as production shifted to lower cost countries. Today the vast majority of mushrooms produced on Taiwan are consumed locally but due to high mushroom consumption the industry is very large. Mushrooms account for 18% of the value of Taiwan's non-meat food production. New farming methods and localized marketing have allowed traditional producers to remain competitive with large industrialized producers.

=== Vegetables ===
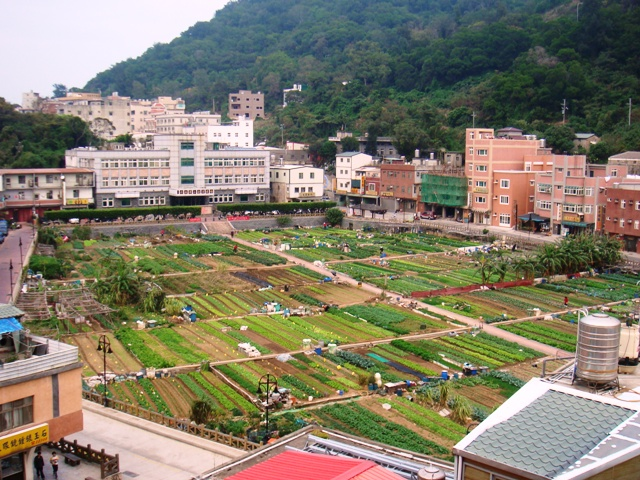
Vegetable farmland in Lienchiang County

In 2013, Taiwan harvested 2.75 million tonnes of vegetables from 1,460 km2 of land with a total value of US$170 million. Major vegetables cultivated include broccoli, cabbage, carrot, chayote, Chinese cabbage, edamame, eggplant, kai-lan, onion, scallion and spinach. Vegetable plantation areas are mostly located in central and southern Taiwan. The peak harvest time is during the autumn and winter seasons.

Vegetable production is increasingly the focus of urban agriculture including vertical farming due to the desire to maximize crop yield from relatively small plots without using excessive amounts of pesticides or fertilizers. Increased production is also driven by a desire to minimize Taiwanese dependence on other countries as sources of fresh produce, especially high value vegetables. Taiwan's vertical vegetable farms are some of the most advanced in the world. Taoyuan's iFarm was Asia's largest vertical farm when it opened in 2018.

==== Sweet potatoes ====
Sweet potatoes have been grown in Taiwan since at least 1603 following their introduction to Asian by the Spanish. However the possibility exists that the sweet potato reached Taiwan before the Spanish colonization of the new world. It rapidly became a staple of local diets. Poor families would often mix sweet potato into their rice or millet to stretch it out. Unlike the other staples of rice and millet, sweet potatoes could be grown on hillsides with limited preparation. Cultivation of sweet potato reached its height during the Japanese colonial period with Taiwan ranking fourth in output from 1934 to 1938 after China, Japan, and the United States with 3.7% of world production. Production fell as a result of World War II and economic disruption. It took off again in the 1950s and 1960s but with most of the crop destined to feed hogs not people. Production fell again after commercial swine producers switched to imported grains like corn for their feed. In modern Taiwan sweet potatoes are grown as a root vegetable, as a leaf vegetable, and for their starch. 40% of the crop is exported to Singapore and Hong Kong with the rest being consumed domestically either fresh or processed. Sweet potatoes are associated with poverty and their consumption is avoided by many elders however sweet potatoes continue to play an important part in Taiwanese cuisine.

Research into the sweet potato at the Chiayi research station of the Taiwan Agricultural Research institute began in 1922. For the first 20 years after its founding in 1971 the World Vegetable Center was a major global sweet potato research center with over 1,600 ascensions in their first two years of operation. In 1991 the World Vegetable Center chose to end its sweet potato research due to high costs and other institutions with a tighter focus coming into existence. The WVC duplicated and transferred its research and germplasm to the International Potato Center and Taiwan Agricultural Research institute.

The counties of Yunlin, Taichung, Miaoli and Changhwa are the main sweet potato producers. Hualien county is known for its unique varieties of sweet potato.

=== Tea ===
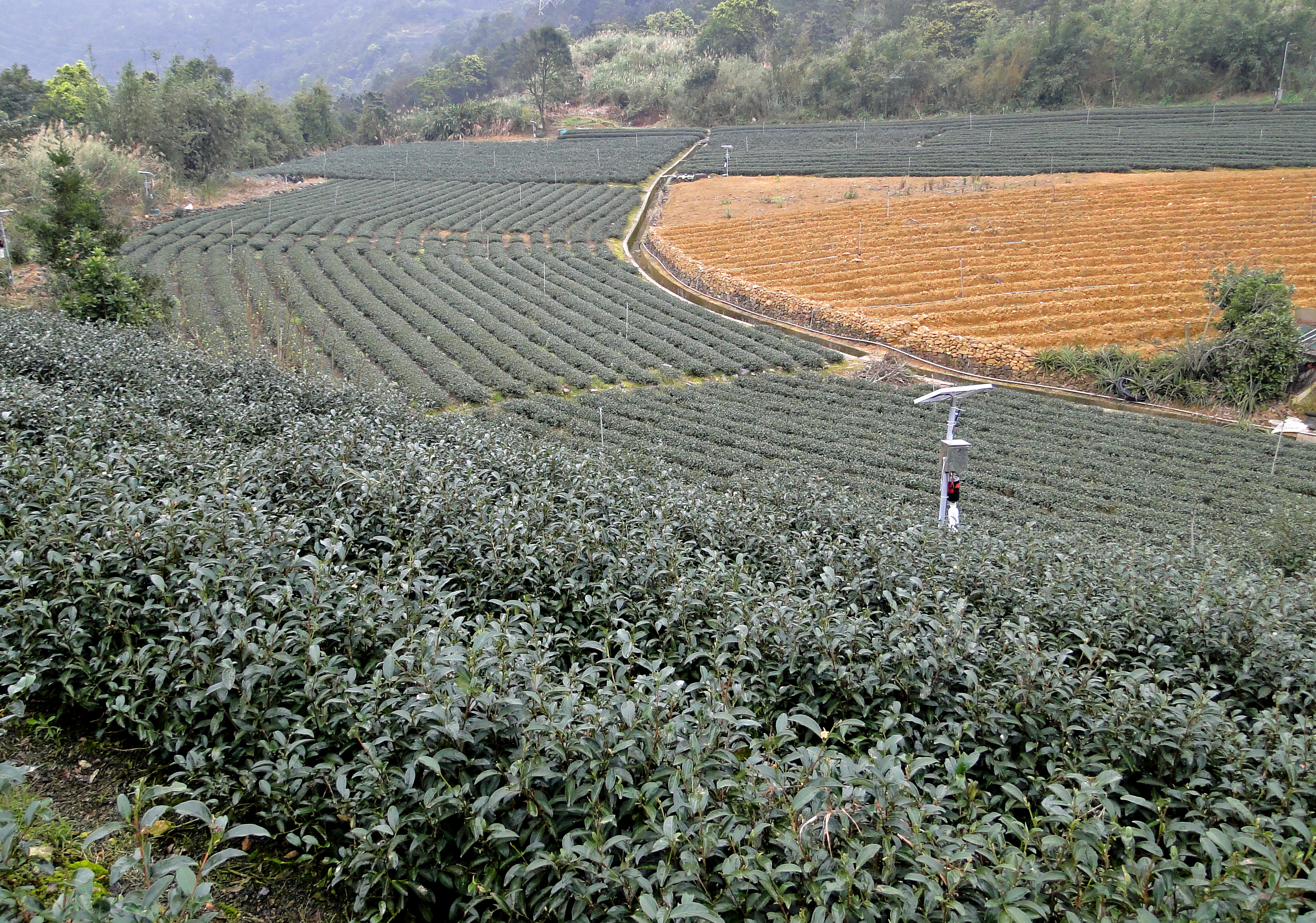
Tea plantation in New Taipei

In 2013, Taiwan harvested about 15,000 tons of tea with a total value of NT$6.92 billion, of which 3,919 tons was exported. Taiwan's tea produces are oolong tea, pouchong tea, green tea and black tea. Taiwan began cultivating tea around two hundred years ago.

=== Flowers ===
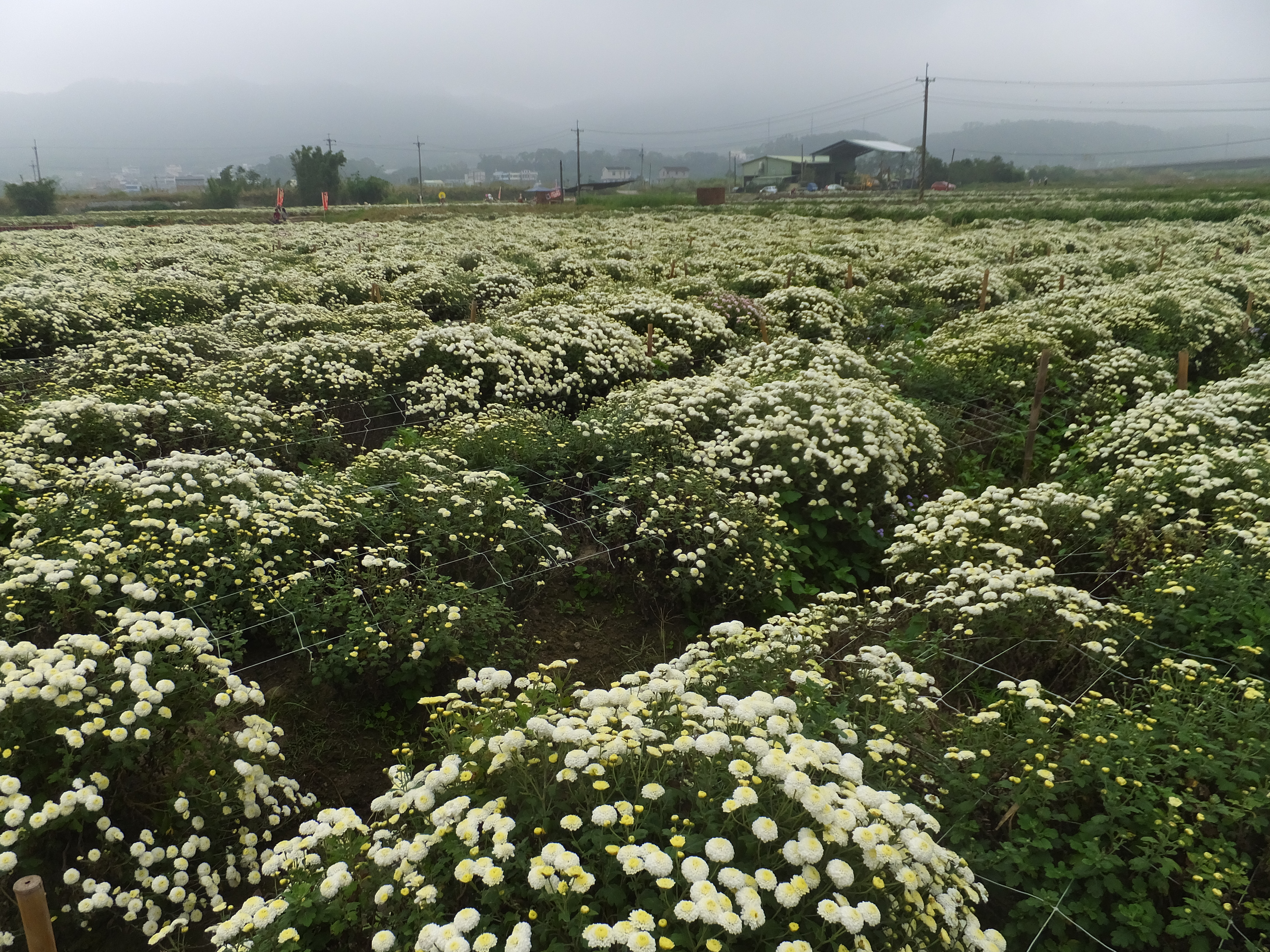
Jiuhu chrysanthemum fields

In 2013, Taiwan harvested flowers with a total value of NT$16.52 billion, in which US$189.7 million of it was exported. Flower plantation land spreads over an area of 138 km2. Chrysanthemum floriculture takes the most land share among other types of flowers. Taiwan is the world's largest exporter of orchids, which represented 87% of the flower export value in 2013. The main export markets for Taiwanese flowers are the United States, Japan and the Netherlands.

The export oriented flower market suffered during the COVID-19 pandemic with an increase in domestic consumption and government support necessary to keep the industry profitable.

The Taipei Flower Market is the largest plant and flower market in Taiwan.

The Taiwan Floriculture Development Association is the primary industry association.

=== Livestock and poultry ===
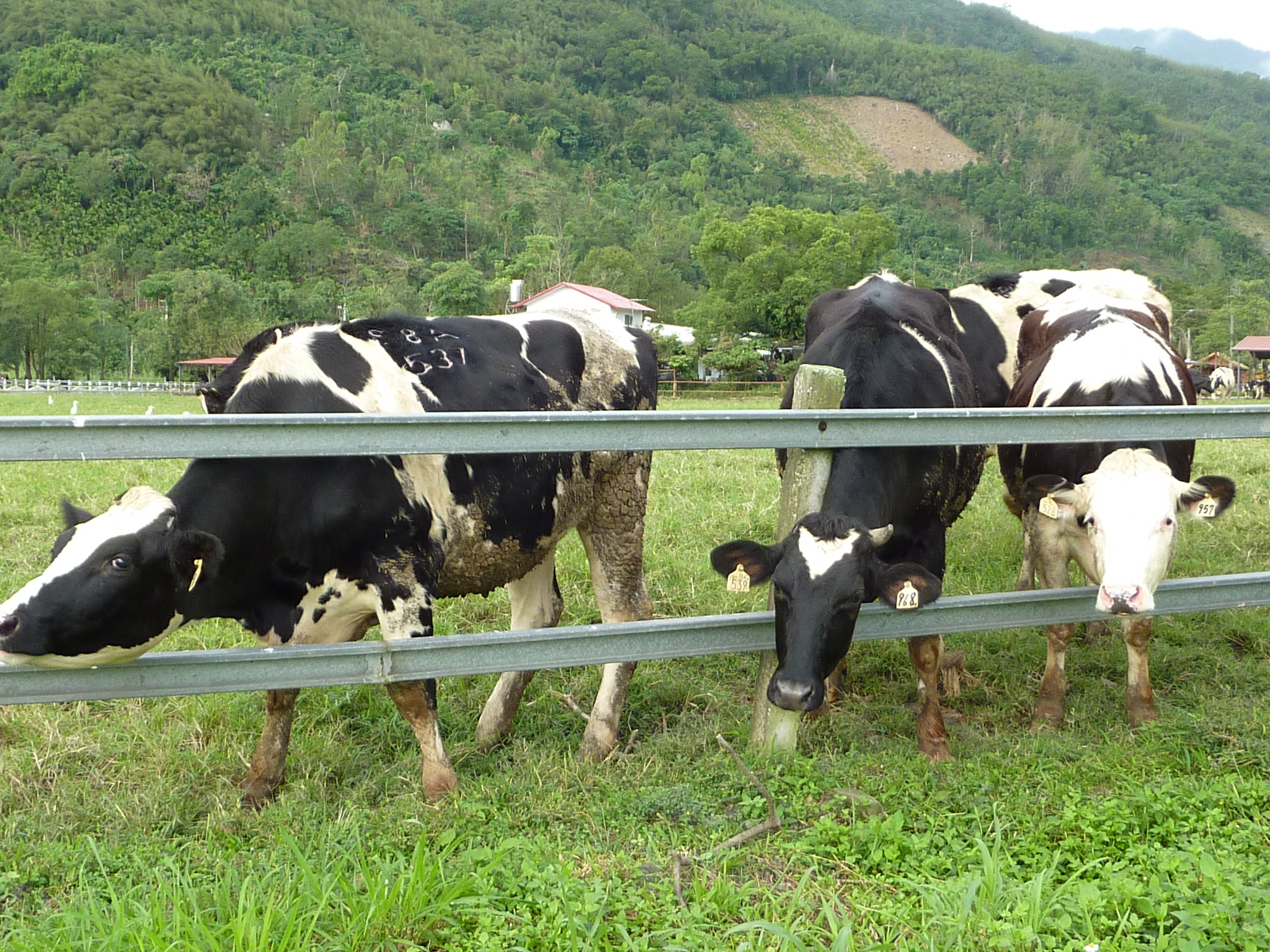
Cattle in Hualien

In 2013, Taiwan produced livestock and poultry with a total value of NT$150 billion. Taiwan's major livestock are pigs, and the major poultry is chickens, both as broilers and eggs. Taiwan exported 10,890 tons of animal products and imported 295,063 tons. 90% of pork consumed in Taiwan is domestically produced.

The Giant African snail was introduced to Taiwan by the Japanese in 1932 and have since formed a significant part of rural food culture. Only since the advent of commercial farming of the white-jade variety in the 1980s has consumption become widespread.

Taiwan is a significant goat producer but produces few sheep, the mandarin for both species is yang (羊) which leads to little distinction between them in cuisine. Most local meat sold as mutton in Taiwan is in fact goat.

==== Pigs ====
Pork production peaked in the years before 1997 when foot-and-mouth disease arrived in Taiwan. In those years Taiwan was the second largest exporter of pork after Denmark. The traditional method of feeding pigs with food scraps has been restricted to the most advanced farms due to concerns about African swine fever. In 2020 three quarters of Taiwan's pork farmers produced less than 1000 pigs a year.

==== Poultry ====
Chicken and egg producers have had a hard time scaling to meet demand because of issues with disposing of large amounts of waste products. Taiwan imports some of its eggs. In 2022 daily egg consumption was 24 million and local production was 22.6 million.

Geese are a significant part of Taiwan's livestock and cuisine.

Turkeys have been raised in Taiwan since partial Dutch colonization, production increased in the 1950s due to demand from US soldiers newly stationed in Taiwan. Turkey production remained significant after the drawdown in US forces.

=== Fisheries and aquaculture ===
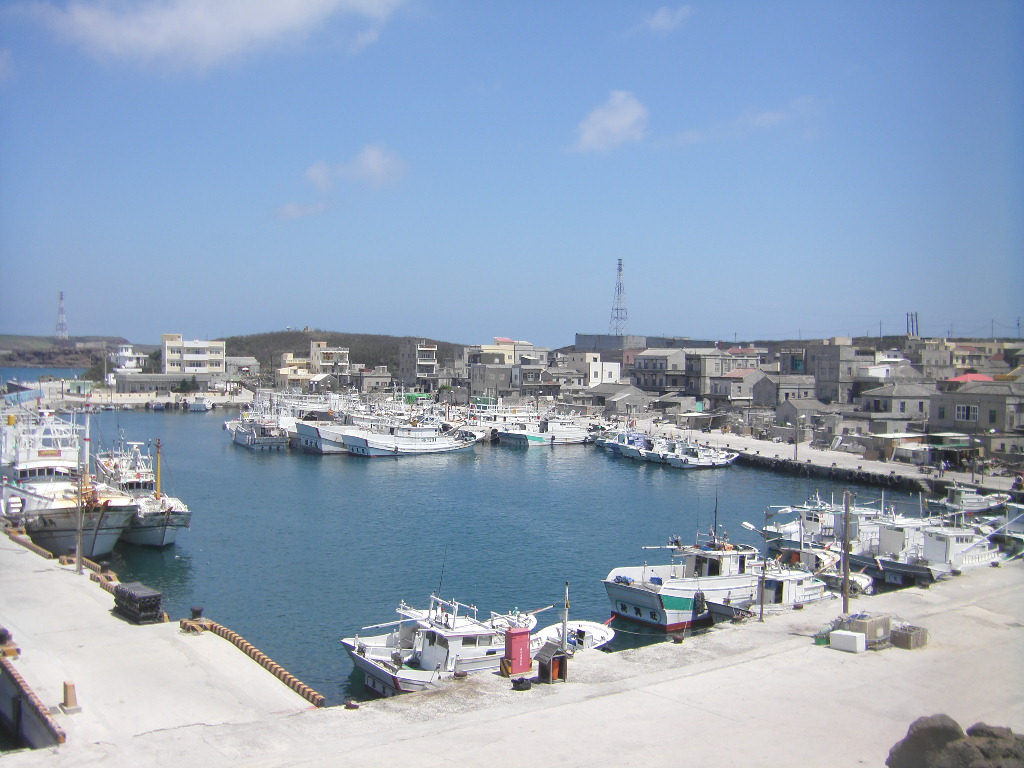
Fishing port in Penghu County

Aquaculture has a long history in Taiwan. By 2006 the production of Taiwanese coastal aquaculture was valued at NT$11,817 million.

In the 21st century high technology is playing a greater part in Taiwan's aquaculture industry as the industry struggles to cope with labor shortages and fierce foreign competition. The Taiwanese government operates six fisheries and aquaculture research centers.

The Aquaculture Taiwan Expo & Forum is the primary aquaculture trade show in Taiwan, it is held concurrently with the Livestock Taiwan Expo & Forum and the Asia Agri-Tech Expo & Forum.

Taiwan is one of the largest fishing nations on earth and the associated fish processing industry is also significant. More than one third of the worlds longline tuna fishing vessels are operated by Taiwanese companies with the total strength of the distant waters fishing fleet at more than 2,000 vessels. The fishing industry is estimated to be worth approximately two billion dollars. Taiwan's ocean fisheries sector employs 350,000 people and there are 130,000 fishing households in Taiwan.

== Economy ==
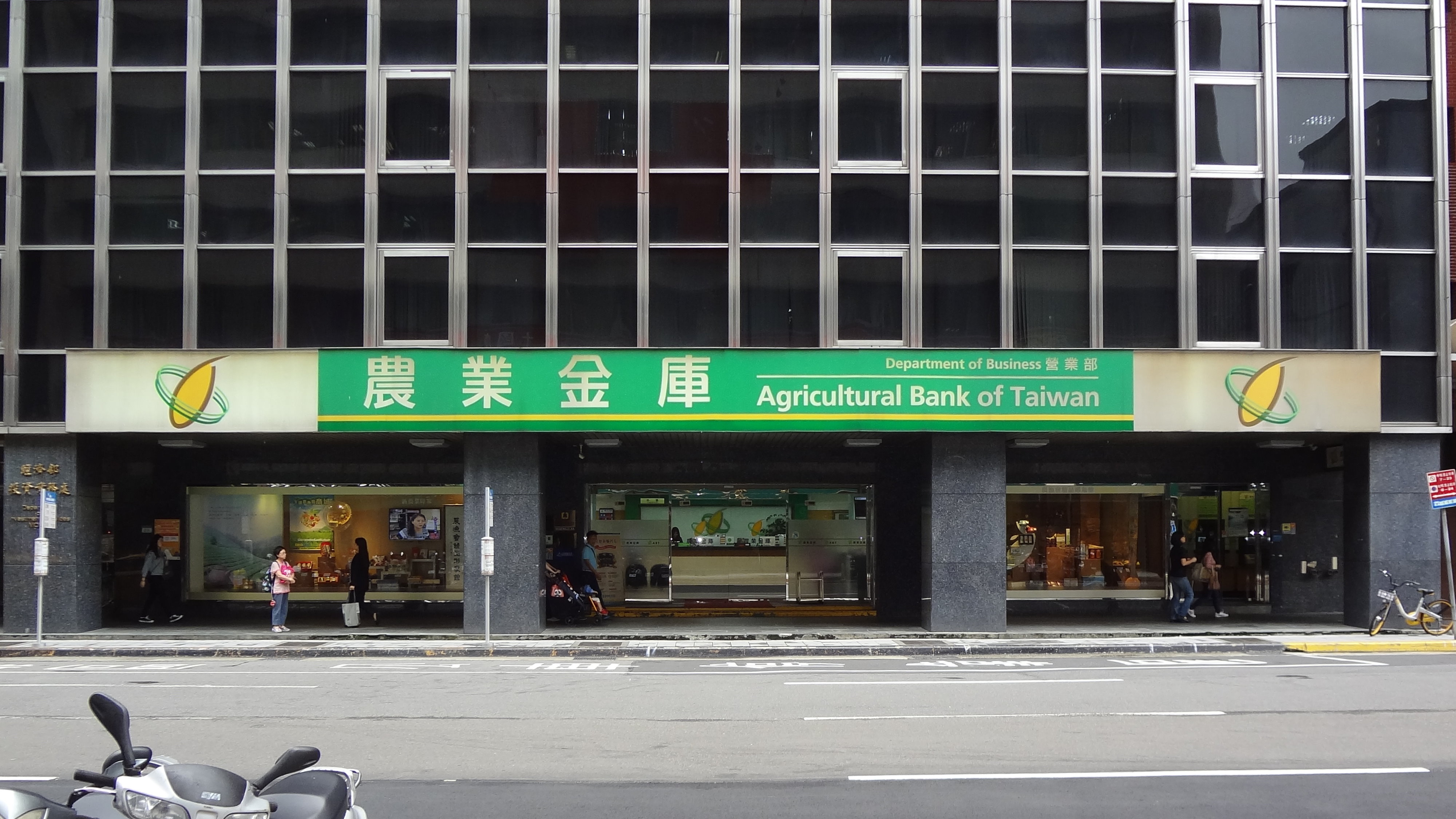
Headquarter of Agricultural Bank of Taiwan in Taipei

In 2023, agriculture accounted for 1.51% of Taiwan's gross domestic product (GDP) with a total value of NT$351 billion. Taiwan exports around US$5 billion worth of agricultural products annually. Major overseas markets include Canada, Mainland China, Japan, the Republic of Korea, Thailand, Vietnam and the United States.

=== Manpower ===
The agriculture sector employs around 500,000 people in Taiwan, about 4.4% of the total population. In 2022, there were around 760,000 farm households. There are 1.1 hectares of cultivatable land per farm family.

=== Finance ===
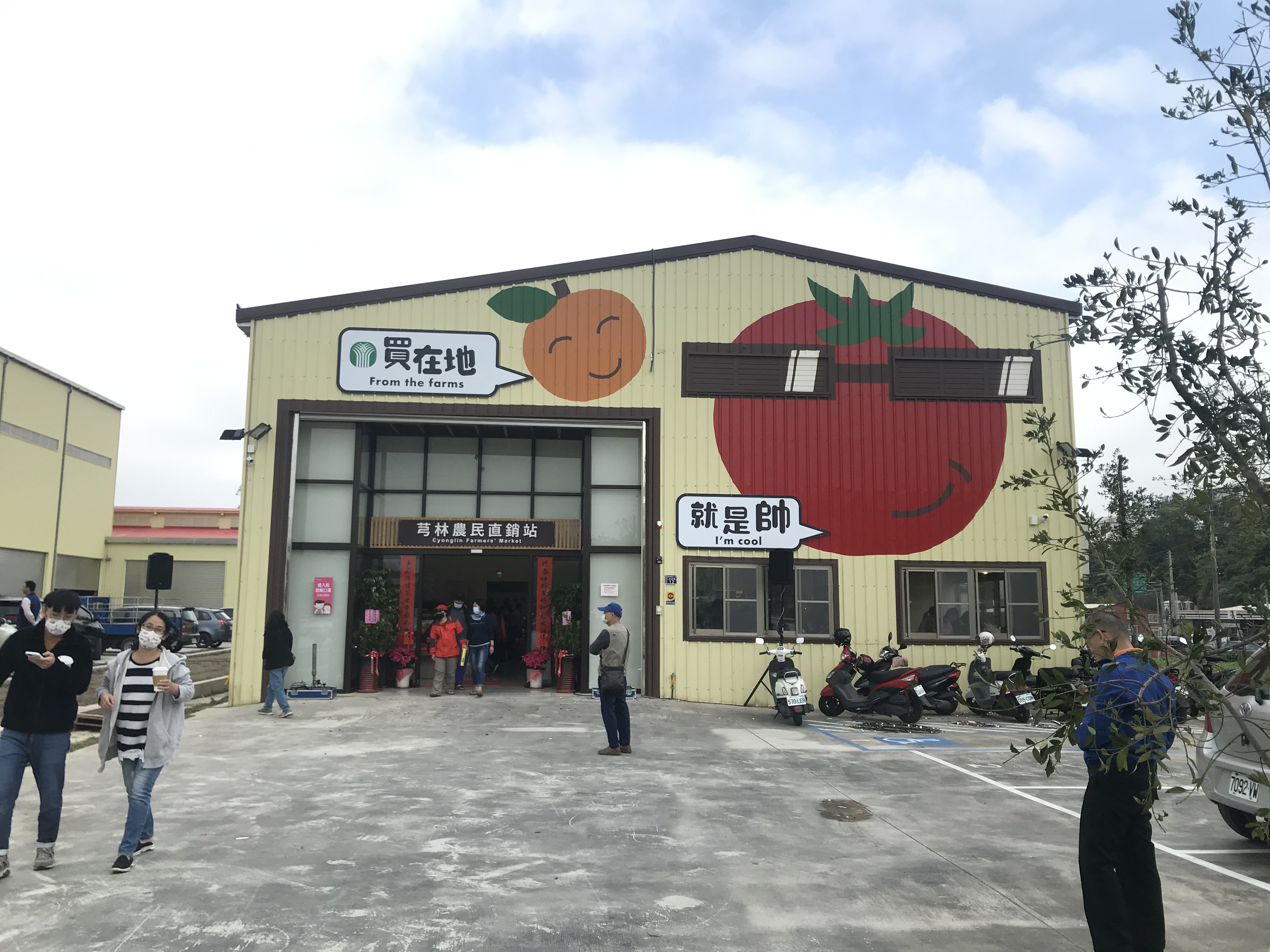
Farmers' market in Qionglin Township, Hsinchu County

Taiwan's agricultural financing system consists of the Agricultural Bank of Taiwan (Chinese: 全國農業金庫) and credit departments of farmers' and fishermen's associations, which fall under the supervision of the Agricultural Finance Agency (Chinese: 農業金融署) of the MOA. The Agricultural Credit Guarantee Fund (Chinese: 農業信用保證基金) is responsible for financing farmers without enough collateral to acquire working capital.

=== Trade events ===
- Nantou Global Tea Expo (Chinese: 南投茶業博覽會)
- The Aquaculture Taiwan Expo & Forum, the Livestock Taiwan Expo & Forum and the Asia Agri-Tech Expo & Forum are all held concurrently.

== Organizations ==
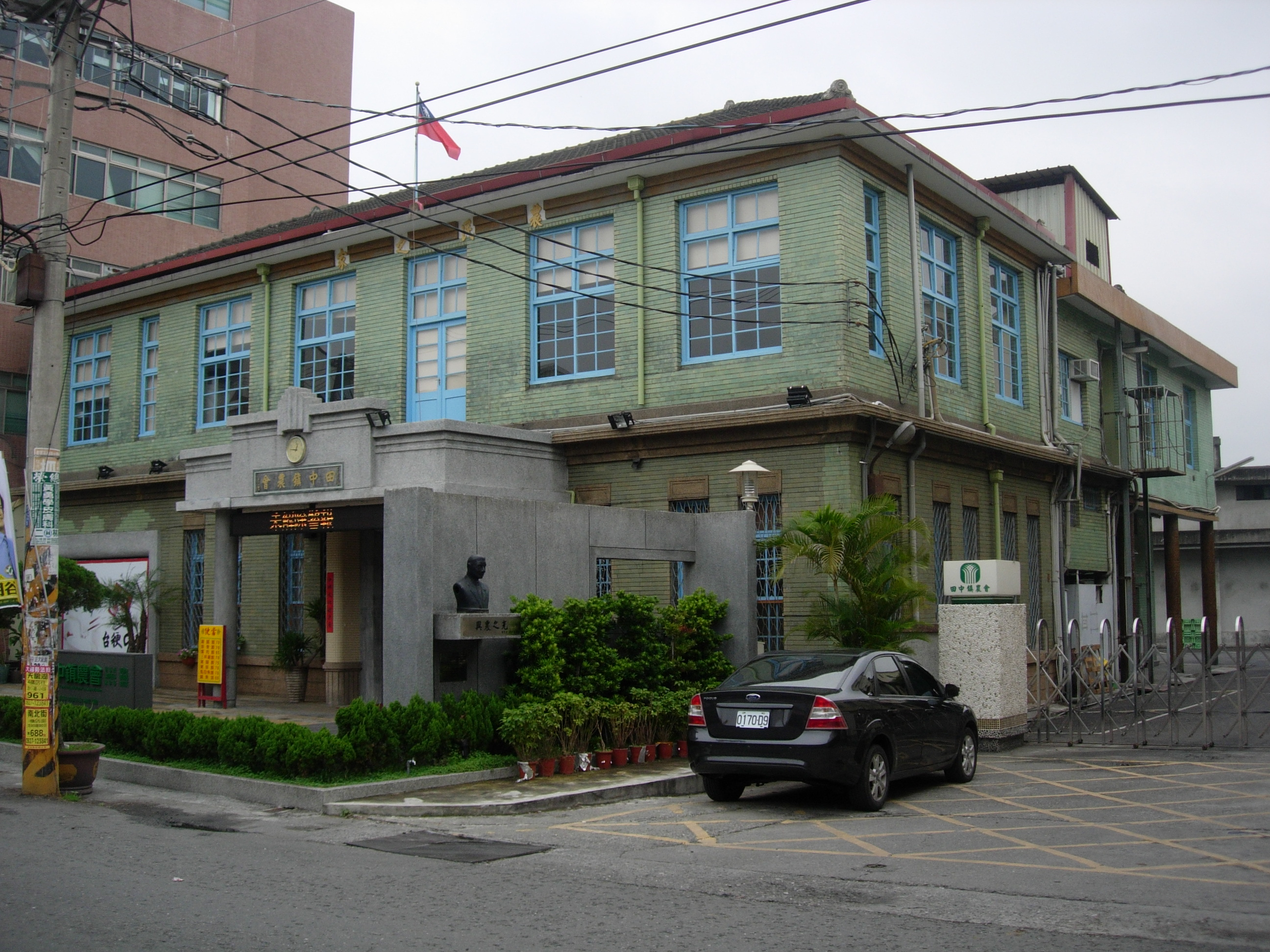
Tianzhong Farmers' Association in Changhua County

Taiwan has a number of agricultural organizations that provide assistance to farmers, such as supply, distribution, and financial services. These include 302 farmers' associations, 40 fishermen's associations and 3,490 irrigation groups.

=== Politics ===
Taiwan had one agrarian political party, the Taiwan Farmers' Party, established on 15 June 2007. However, the party was disbanded on 3 October 2019.

== Research ==
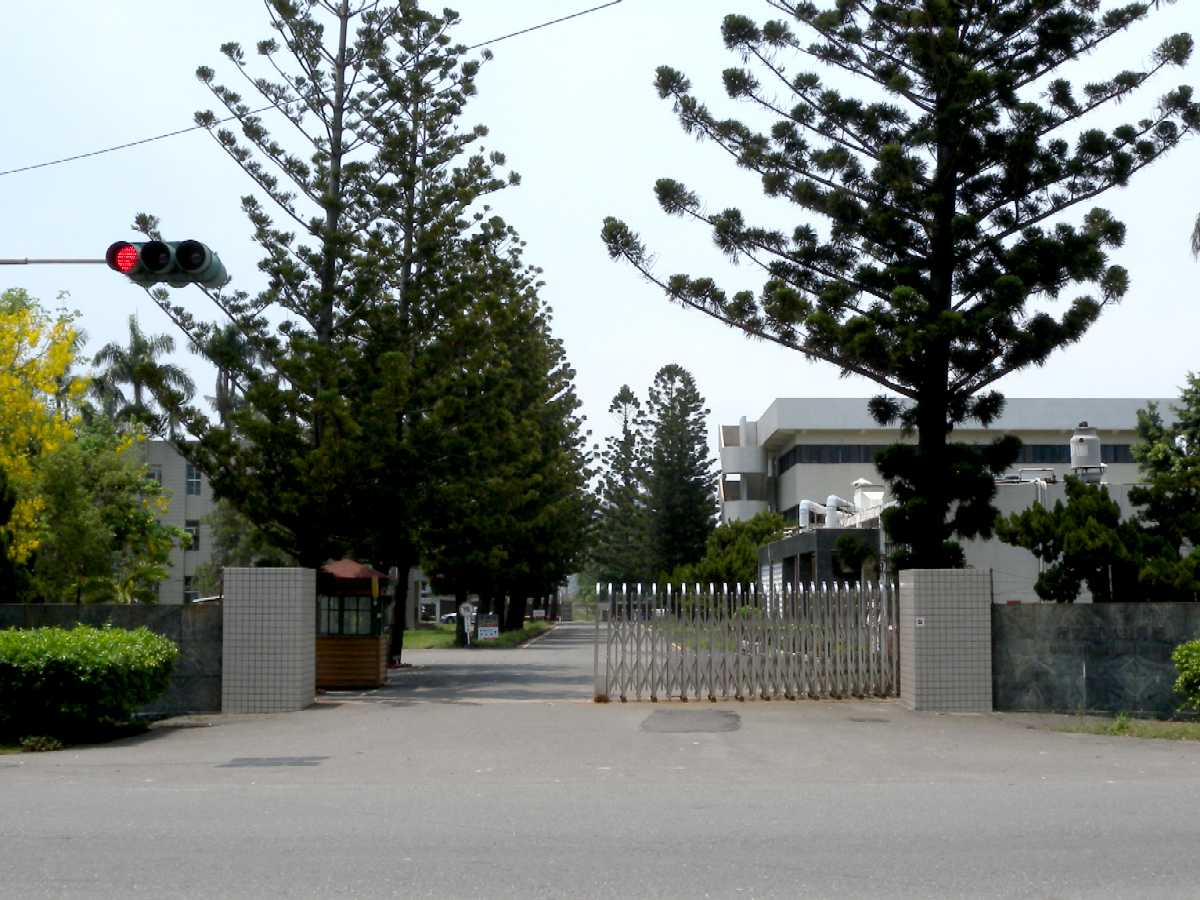
Taiwan Sugar Research Institute in Tainan

There are 16 research institutes established under the COA aimed to the development and innovation of technologies in agriculture-related produce. In 2023, the Taiwan Agricultural Research Institute made 67 agricultural technology transfers to the private sector, earning NT$7.1 million in licensing fee and around NT$500,000 in royalties.

=== Research centers ===
- Kinmen Fisheries Research Institute
- Taiwan Banana Research Institute
- Taiwan Livestock Research Institute
- Taiwan Sugar Research Institute
- Tea Research and Extension Station

== Technology ==
=== Spatial planning ===
Spatial planning for agricultural farms in Taiwan is embedded into the Taiwan Agriculture Land Information Service (Chinese: 臺灣農地資訊服務網) whose data is collected by Formosat-2 earth observation satellite. Information of farmland availability, soil properties, cropping suitability, irrigation infrastructures, land use zoning, and land consolidation are available for public access.

== Security ==
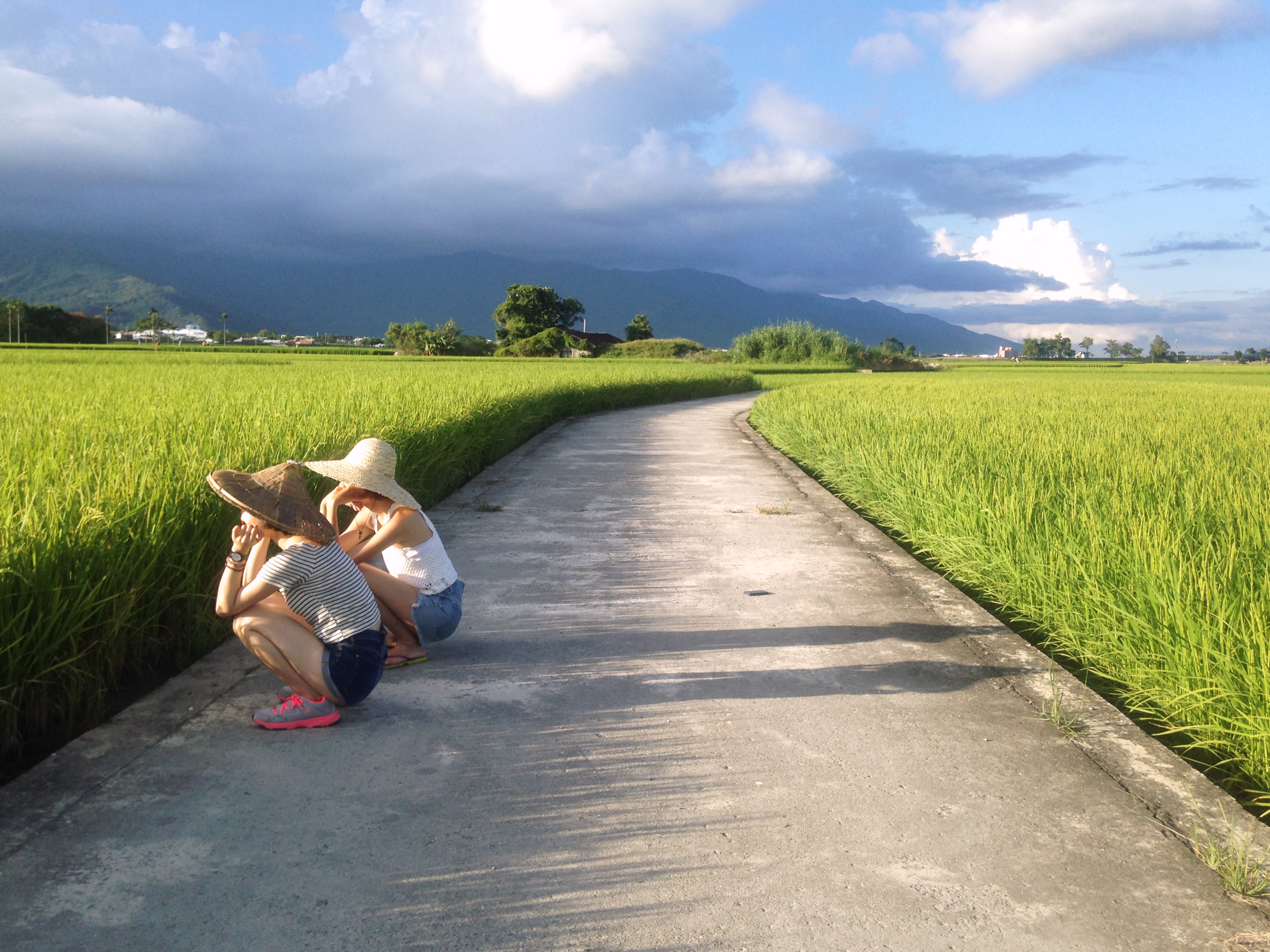
Paddy fields in Chishang Taitung

In 2020, the food self-sufficiency of Taiwan was 35%. President Tsai Ing-wen has stated that she hopes Taiwan's food self-sufficiency can be raised to 40% in the near term.

As of 2021 the nation's rice reserves were large enough to feed the country for 18 months with fruit and vegetable reserves of six months.

== Energy usage ==
In 2014, agriculture sector consumed a total 2,832.9 GWh of electricity. Between 2000 and 2009, annual agricultural sector in Taiwan consumed 15.81 billion tons of water.

== Tourism ==
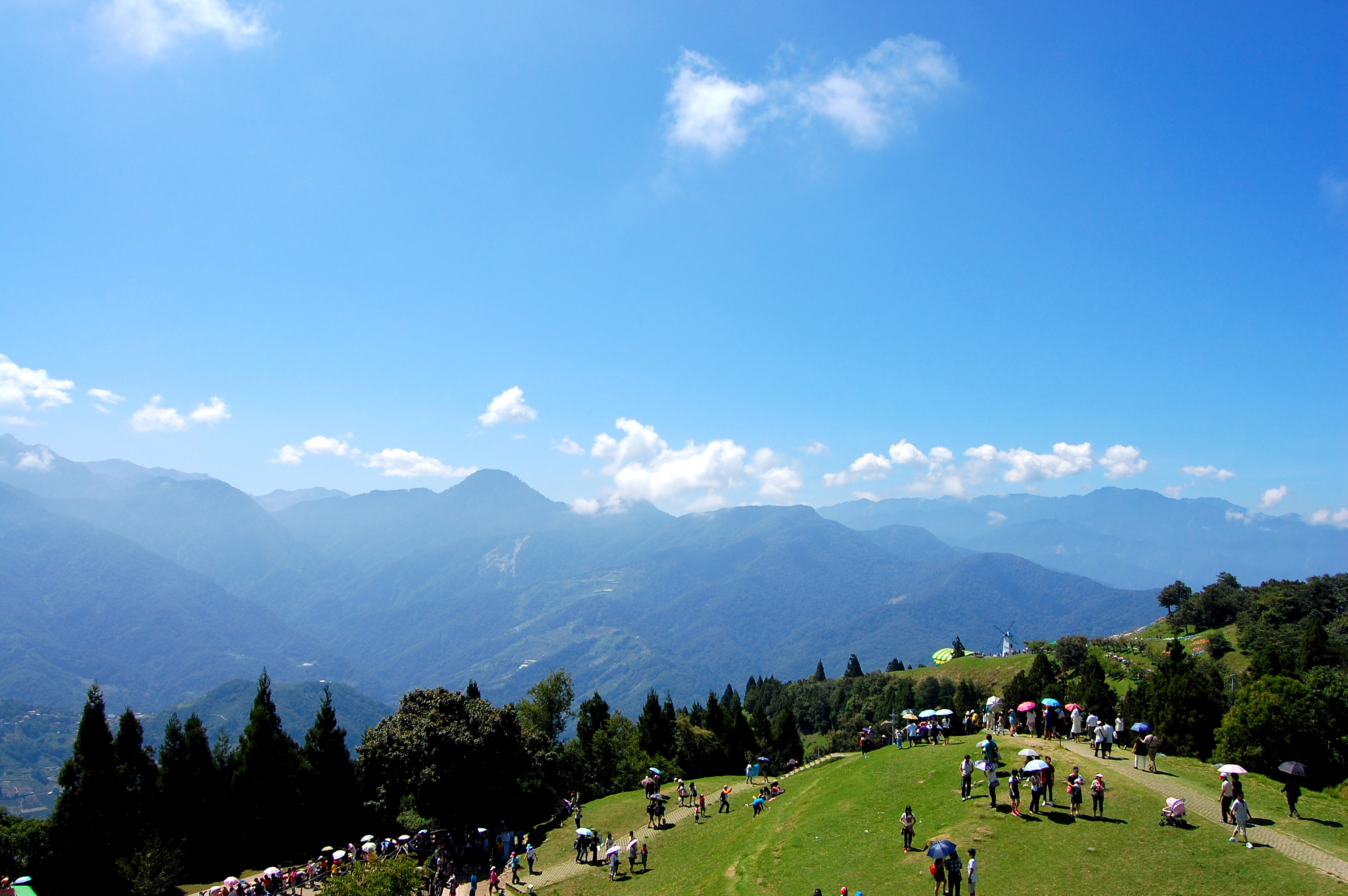
Qingjing Farm in Nantou County

Over the past few years, agritourism has become more and more popular in Taiwan. The government has built recreational areas around farms and fishing villages by integrating the produce, nature and festivals. In 2013, there are more than 75 recreation farming zones have been established and there are almost 317 recreational farms have been licensed. Food-related museums are also plenty in Taiwan.

Agritourism forms a significant part of the total revenue for the agricultural industry. Many small family farms rely on tourism as their primary means of earning an income. Leisure farms, farm tours, farm stays, and other tourism related activities are popular both with domestic Taiwanese travelers and with international ones. The Taiwanese Agritourism industry has received significant state support. In 2018 TreeHugger ranked Taiwan the #1 agritourism destination in the world.

Fruit tourism is a subsection of agritourism with fruit picking being the prime attraction. Taiwan's diverse subtropical climate means that there is always some sort of fruit in season. Fruit tourism is popular with both domestic and international tourists. The region of Pingtung in particular is a fruit tourism destination.

=== Farms ===
Erjie Rice Barn, Flying Cow Ranch, Fushoushan Farm, Fuxing Barn, Jingzaijiao Tile-paved Salt Fields, Qingjing Farm, Rareseed Ranch, Shangri-La Leisure Farm, Shanlong Vegetable Park, Toucheng Leisure Farm, Tsou Ma Lai Farm and Wuling Farm.

In 2021 as a result of the tourism downturn due to the COVID-19 pandemic the Council of Agriculture announced subsidies for leisure farms.

=== Converted farmlands ===
Aogu Wetland and Chukou Nature Center.

=== Museums ===
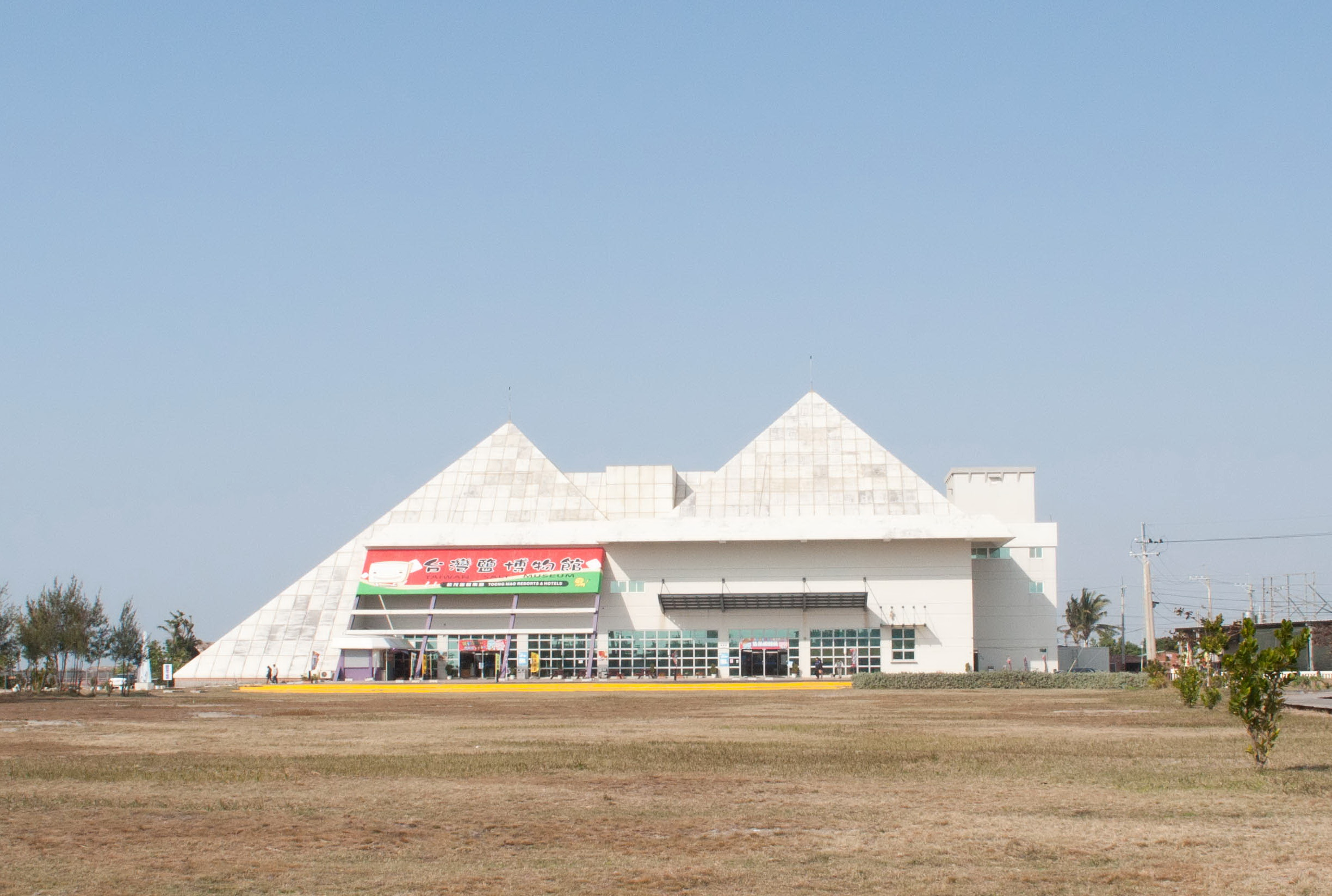
Taiwan Salt Museum

Chihsing Tan Katsuo Museum, Coca-Cola Museum, Honey Museum, Kuo Yuan Ye Museum of Cake and Pastry, Ping Huang Coffee Museum, Ping-Lin Tea Museum, Soya-Mixed Meat Museum, Soy Sauce Brewing Museum, Spring Onion Culture Museum, Taiwan Mochi Museum, Taiwan Nougat Museum, Taiwan Salt Museum, Taiwan Sugar Museum, Teng Feng Fish Ball Museum, Wu Tao Chishang Lunch Box Cultural History Museum, Yilan Distillery Chia Chi Lan Wine Museum, Republic of Chocolate, and Zhuzihu Ponlai Rice Foundation Seed Field Story House.

== See also ==
- Beer in Taiwan
- Geography of Taiwan
- Taiwanese cuisine
- Taiwanese whisky
- Forestry in Taiwan
