= Golden Lippens =

Edible fruit cultivar

Mangifera 'Golden Lippens'
- Genus: Mangifera
- Species: Mangifera indica
- Hybrid parentage: 'Lippens' x unknown
- Cultivar: 'Golden Lippens'
- Origin: Florida, USA

The 'Golden Lippens' mango is a named mango cultivar that originated in south Florida.

== History ==
The original tree was a seedling of the Lippens, mango planted in 1942 by Peter and Irene Lippens of Miami, Florida. It first fruited in 1951.

Golden Lippens gained some notoriety for its flavor and excellent production characteristics, and was later sold as nursery stock for home planting on a limited scale.

== Description ==
The fruit is of oblong shape and typically contains a small lateral beak at the bottom. The skin turns yellow at maturity, often with a light pink colored blush. The flesh is yellow and fiberless, with a rich sweet flavor and contains a monoembryonic seed. Fruit production of Golden Lippens tends to be high in Florida, where the fruit typically matures from June to July. At maturity the fruit ranges from a pound to 2 pounds in weight.

The tree is of medium size and is a vigorous grower. It has an open and upright canopy.
