= Paul Sun =

Taiwanese agronomist (1937–2018)

Sun Ming-hsien
- 孫明賢

Minister of the Council of Agriculture
- In office November 1992 – June 1996
- Deputy: Lin Hsiang-nung
- Preceded by: Yu Yu-hsien
- Succeeded by: Tjiu Mau-ying

Personal details
- Born: Sun Ming-hsien; 8 June 1937 Tainan, Taiwan, Empire of Japan
- Died: 21 January 2018 (aged 80)
- Education: National Taiwan University (BS); University of Minnesota (MS); Purdue University (PhD)

Sun Ming-hsien (Chinese: 孫明賢; pinyin: Sūn Míngxián; 8 June 1937 – 21 January 2018), also known by his English name Paul Sun, was a Taiwanese agronomist.

== Early life and education ==
Sun was born on June 8, 1937, in Tainan. He graduated from National Taiwan University with a bachelor's degree, then completed graduate studies in the United States, where he earned a master's degree from the University of Minnesota and then, in 1971, his Ph.D. in plant taxonomy and agronomy from Purdue University. His doctoral dissertation was titled, "Parasitism of Sclerophthora macrospora on corn".

== Career ==
After receiving his doctorate, Sun became active in Taiwan's conservation movement. In 1992, while serving the Taiwan Provincial Government as head of the Department of Agriculture and Forestry, Sun founded the Taiwan Endemic Species Research Institute. In November of that year, Sun was appointed agriculture minister and retained his position under premier Lien Chan. In June 1996, Sun was succeeded by Tjiu Mau-ying.

After stepping down, Sun continued to work with the Council of Agriculture as an ambassador at large and frequently traveled to the United States to promote agricultural cooperation. Sun joined the China-based Taiwan Agricultural Entrepreneurship Garden in September 2009, while chairman of the World Vegetable Center in Taiwan. Several legislators believed this to be a conflict of interest. Additionally, Sun led the 21st Century Foundation. On 21 January 2018, Sun died of pancreatic cancer, aged 80.
