= Chen Wu-hsiung =

Taiwanese agricultural economist

- 陳武雄

Minister of Council of Agriculture of the Republic of China
- In office 20 May 2008 – 6 February 2012
- Preceded by: Su Chia-chyuan
- Succeeded by: Chen Bao-ji

Deputy Minister of Council of Agriculture
- In office 1999–2002
- Minister: Chen Hsi-huang; Fan Chen-tsung

Personal details
- Born: 11 March 1944 (age 82) Taihoku, Taiwan, Empire of Japan
- Party: Kuomintang
- Education: National Chung Hsing University (BS, MS); University of Illinois Urbana-Champaign (PhD); National Chengchi University (MPA)

Chen Wu-hsiung (Chinese: 陳武雄; pinyin: Chén Wǔxióng; born 11 March 1944) is a Taiwanese agricultural economist. He was the Minister of the Council of Agriculture of the Executive Yuan from 2008 to 2012.

== Education ==
Chen graduated from National Chung Hsing University with a Bachelor of Science in 1966 and a Master of Science in 1970, both in agricultural economics. He then completed doctoral studies in the United States, where he earned his Ph.D. in agricultural economics from the University of Illinois Urbana-Champaign in 1980. His doctoral dissertation, completed under economist John Troy Scott, was titled, " An economic study on government rice stock operation in Taiwan". In 1981, he earned a Master of Public Administration (M.P.A.) from National Chengchi University.

== Council of Agriculture ==
As part of a public service career spanning four decades, Chen was deputy minister of the Council of Agriculture from 1999 to 2002. He then served as consultant to the Executive Yuan. He was appointed head of the COA by Liu Chao-shiuan in April 2008, and took office on 20 May 2008.

In December 2010, Chen said that the agricultural industry in Taiwan was gaining strategic importance due to the growing global food crisis caused by climate change and natural disasters. He stated that the Council of Agriculture (COA) was working towards health, efficiency and sustainability in agriculture, and also building on the growing concern over food safety and quality. The COA also had encouraged farmers to boost agricultural tourism through 242 agritourism farms and ranches across Taiwan. The COA also had promoted the use of non-toxic farming by encouraging farmers to reduce their use of chemical pesticides, synthetic fertilizers and additives during production.

Chen Wu-hsiung was not retained when Sean Chen took office as premier.

== Later career ==
Chen Wu-hsiung began practicing Eight-Form Moving Meditation espoused by Dharma Drum Mountain in 2002. Chen devised Destressing Living Zen for use in daily life.
