= First of May (2015 film) =

- Poster
- 五月一號
- Directed by: Zhou Getai
- Written by: Yuan Chiung-chiung
- Produced by: Liao Ching-sung
- Starring: Richie Jen; Alyssa Chia; Lyan Cheng; Cindy Yang
- Release date: 1 May 2015 (Taiwan)
- Country: Taiwan
- Language: Mandarin
- Box office: CN¥3.9 million (mainland China)

First of May (Chinese: 五月一號) is a 2015 Taiwanese romantic-drama film. It was directed by Zhou Getai and written by Yuan Chiung-chiung. The film stars Richie Jen, Alyssa Chia, Lyan Cheng, and Cindy Yang. It was the latter's first and final film before her suicide. The film was released in Taiwan on 1 May 2015. The film’s title music was the Bee Gees’ song “First of May”. The Bee Gees’ album “Odessa” played a minor part in the dialogue of the film, as the group’s music had previously been banned in Taiwan.

== Cast ==
- Richie Jen
- Alyssa Chia
- Lyan Cheng
- Cindy Yang
- Kate Yeung - Kiki
- Tou Chung-hua

== Release ==
The film was released in Taiwan on 1 May 2015 and in mainland China on 30 October 2015.

== Reception ==
The film earned CN¥3.947 million at the mainland Chinese box office.
