= WVC =

WVC may refer to:

- Windows Virtual Console
- Wenatchee Valley College
- World Vegetable Center
