= Wang Cheng-teng =

Taiwanese politician

- 王政騰

Deputy Minister of the Council of Agriculture of the Republic of China
- Minister: Chen Bao-ji

Wang Cheng-teng (Chinese: 王政騰; pinyin: Wáng Zhèngténg) is a Taiwanese politician. He currently serves as the Deputy Minister of the Council of Agriculture.

== Council of Agriculture Deputy Ministry ==
=== Rural Development Foundation promotion on agricultural policies of Mainland China ===
In June 2009, Wang told to the Democratic Progressive Party legislators that the COA had commissioned the Rural Development Foundation to research information on mainland Chinese agriculture to help cross-strait development, after the accusation that the foundation website only promoted mainland China's agriculture policies instead of assisting agriculture development in foreign countries.

=== 9th Asia Pacific Poultry Conference ===
During the opening ceremony of the 9th Asia Pacific Poultry Conference held in Taipei on 20 March 2011, Wang said that the conference will facilitate international exchanges and scientific collaboration in poultry breeding. It will also help Taiwanese poultry industry.

=== Council of Agriculture policy explanatory hearing on US beef controversy ===
In April 2012, Wang was the chairman for the Council of Agriculture policy explanatory hearing in Chiayi City on US beef controversy. The council hosted the event to explain the government's policy on US beef to the public and also to listen to what the public had to say. The event was held with the assistance with private foundations.
