= Cindy Yang (actress) =

Taiwanese actress and model

- Born: Peng Hsin-yi; 4 December 1990; Taichung, Taiwan
- Died: 21 April 2015 (aged 24); Taichung, Taiwan
- Cause of death: Suicide by helium inhalation
- Occupations: Actress, model
- Years active: 2011–2015
- Parent: Peng Tso-kwei (father)

Cindy Yang or Yang You-ying (Chinese: 楊又穎; pinyin: Yáng Yòuyǐng; 4 December 1990 – 21 April 2015), born Peng Hsin-yi (彭馨逸), was a Taiwanese actress and model. She was known for her appearances on 100% Entertainment, the youth-centered television show University, and the film First of May (2015). She was born on 4 December 1990, in Taichung, to politician Peng Tso-kwei.

On 21 April 2015, Yang, aged 24, committed suicide by helium inhalation after suffering from prolonged cyberbullying. A suicide note written by Yang expressed the hope her death would bring attention to the seriousness of bullying. Yang also blamed coworkers for her decision to commit suicide.

A funeral service was held in Taichung on 24 April 2015. At the time of her death, fans and entertainers expressed their sympathy along with their condemnation of netizens' cyberbullying.
