= Agriculture and Food Agency =

Agency in Taiwan

- 農業部農糧署

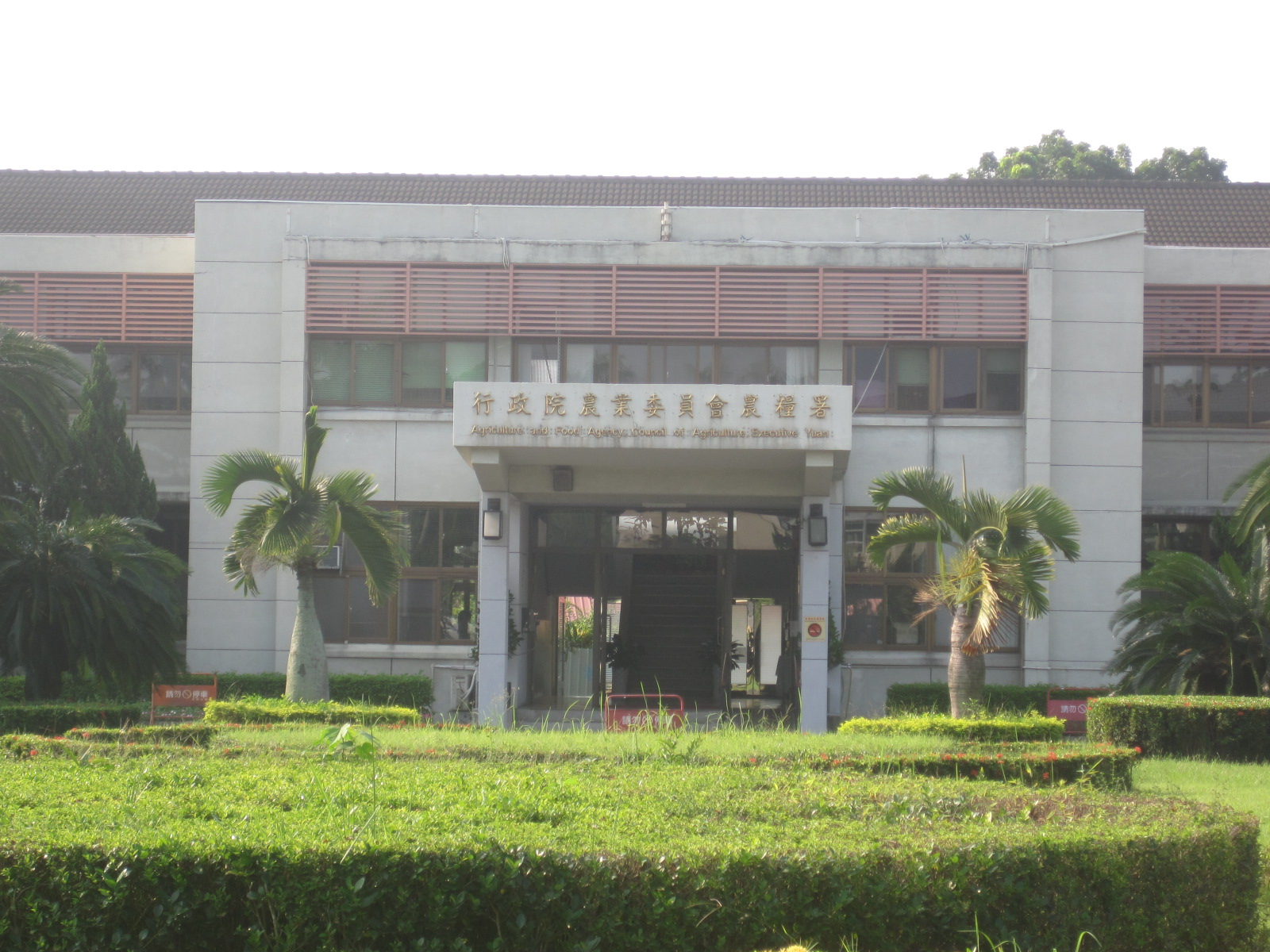

Agency overview
- Jurisdiction: Republic of China (Taiwan)
- Headquarters: Nantou City, Nantou County; 25.043029°N 121.526960°E
- Agency executive: Hu Jong-i, Director-General
- Parent agency: Ministry of Agriculture
- Website: www.afa.gov.tw

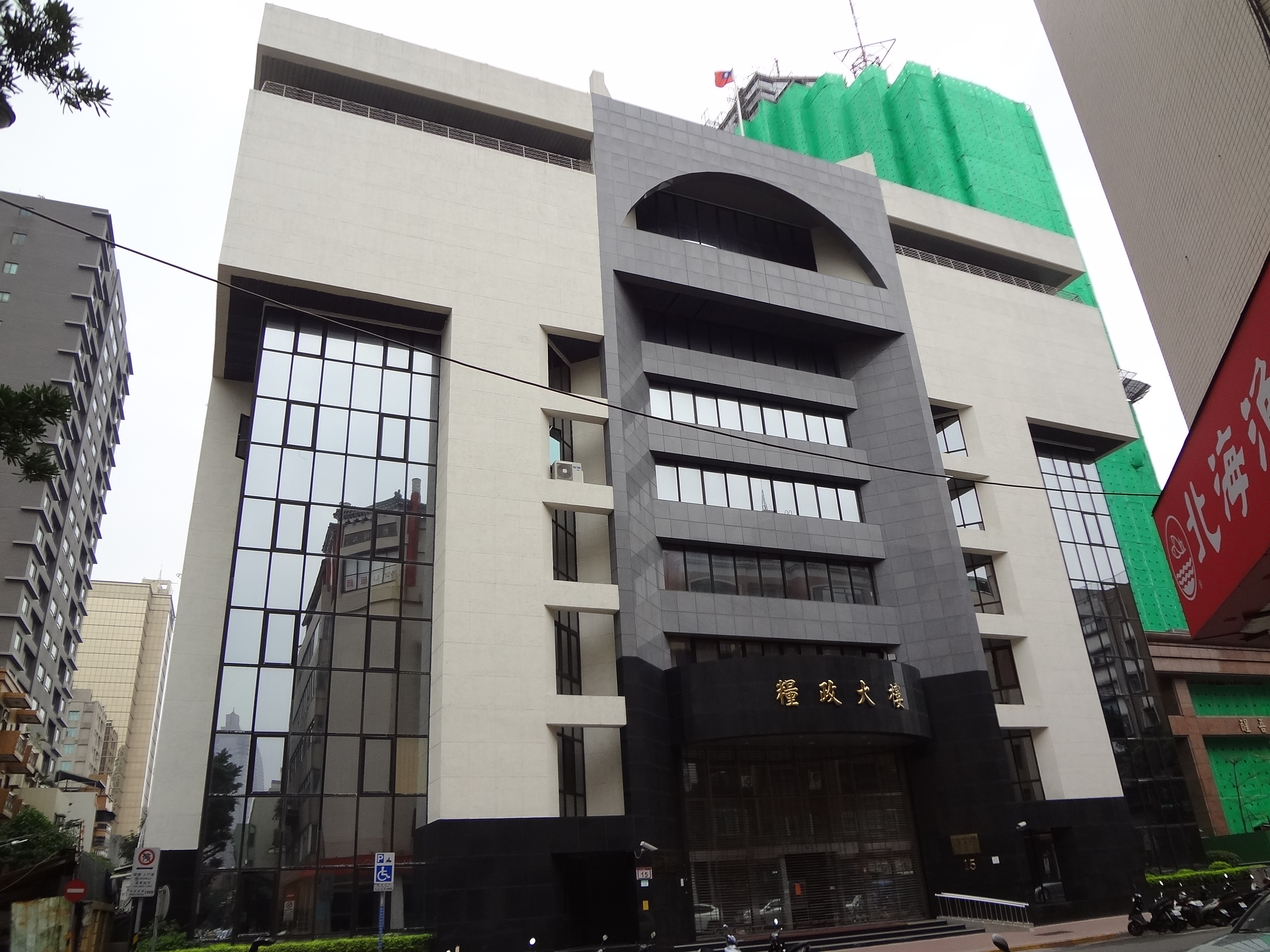
Taipei Office of Agriculture and Food Agency

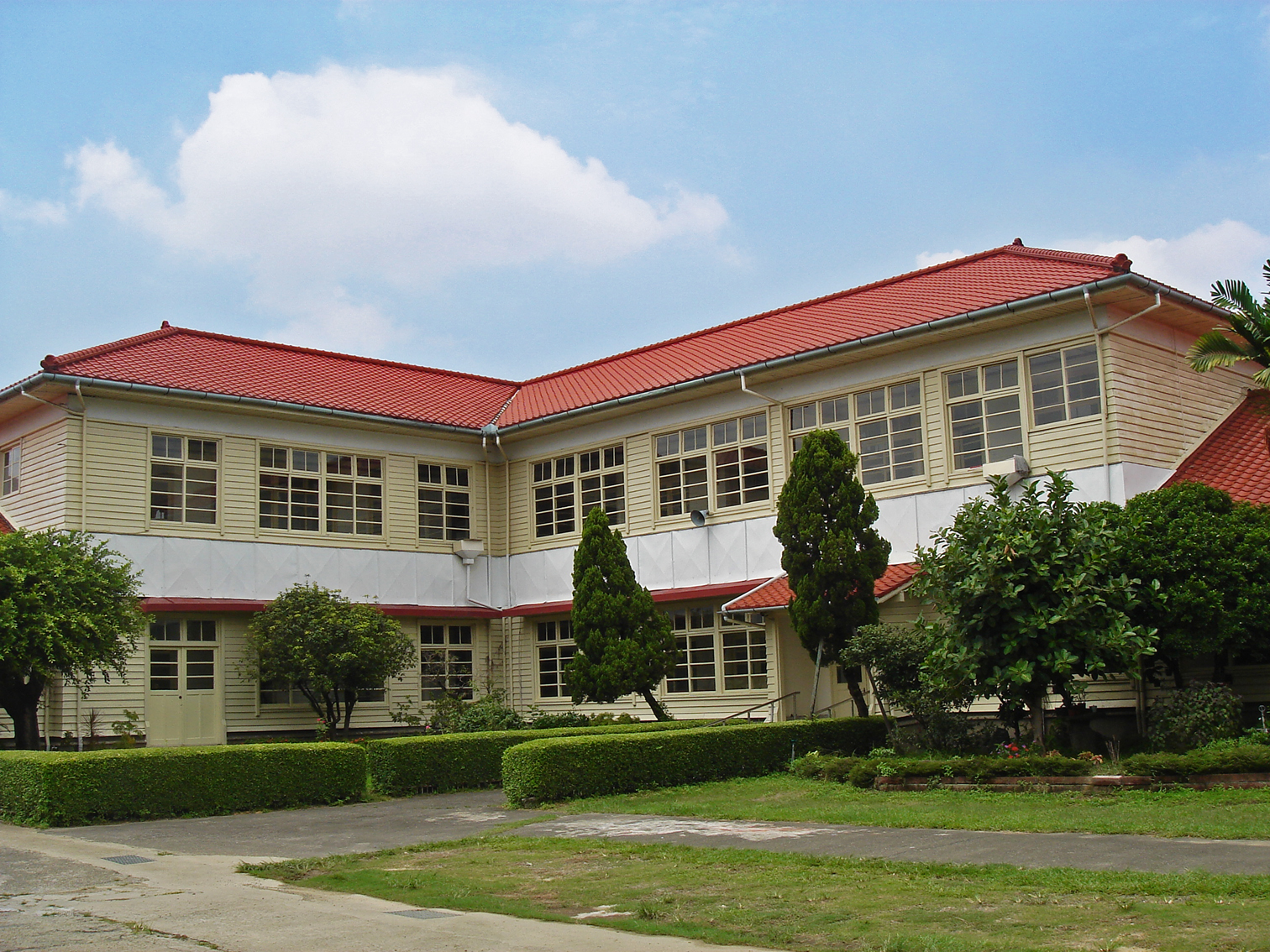
Taichung Office of Agriculture and Food Agency

The Agriculture and Food Agency (AFA; traditional Chinese: 農業部農糧署; simplified Chinese: 农业部农粮署; pinyin: Xíngzhèngyuàn Nóngyè Wěiyuánhuì Nóngliángshǔ) is an agency of the Ministry of Agriculture of Taiwan (ROC) handling affairs related to agricultural production.

== Organizational structure ==
=== Operational divisions ===
- Planning Division
- Crop Production Division
- Farm Chemicals and Machinery Division
- Marketing and Processing Division
- Food Industry Division
- Food Warehousing and Transportation Division

=== Administrative divisions ===
- Secretariat
- Civil Service Ethics Office
- Statistics Office
- Accounting Office
- Personnel Office

== Branches ==
- Northern Regional Office in Taoyuan City
- Central Regional Office in Changhua County
- Southern Regional Office in Tainan City
- Eastern Regional Office in Hualien County

== List of directors ==
- Li Tsang-lang (17 June 2011 -?)
- Hu Jong-i (incumbent)

== Transportation ==
The agency is accessible within walking distance East from Shandao Temple Station of Taipei Metro.

== See also ==
- Agriculture in Taiwan
