= Chen Bao-ji =

Taiwanese nutritionist

- 陳保基
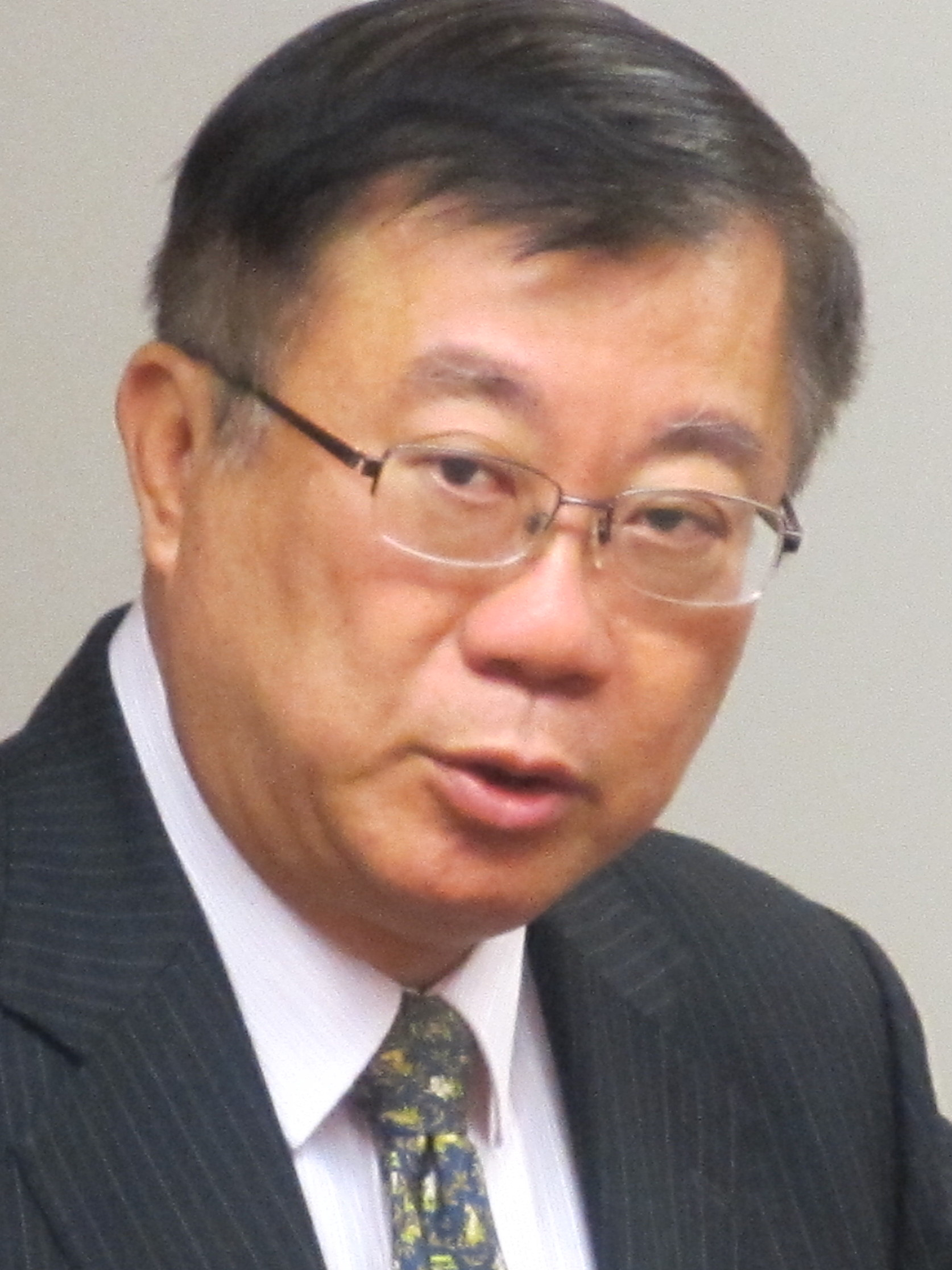

Minister of Council of Agriculture of the Republic of China
- In office 6 February 2012 – 31 January 2016
- Deputy: Wang Cheng-teng
- Preceded by: Chen Wu-hsiung
- Succeeded by: Chen Chih-ching

Personal details
- Born: 9 November 1953 (age 72) Chaozhou, Pingtung County, Taiwan
- Education: National Taiwan University (BS, MS); Cornell University (PhD)

Chen Bao-ji (traditional Chinese: 陳保基; simplified Chinese: 陈保基; pinyin: Chén Bǎojī; born 9 November 1953) is a Taiwanese nutritionist. He served as the Minister of Council of Agriculture from 6 February 2012 to 31 January 2016.

== Early life and education ==
Chen was born in Chaozhou, Pingtung, on November 9, 1953. He graduated from National Taiwan University with a Bachelor of Science in animal science in 1975 and a Master of Science in animal science in 1977. He then completed doctoral studies in the United States, earning his Ph.D. in animal nutrition from Cornell University in 1989. His doctoral dissertation was titled, "Studies on the conversion of tryptophan to niacin in chickens and ducks."

== Council of Agriculture ==
=== 2013 H7N9 flu virus outbreak ===
In end of April 2013, during the H7N9 flu virus outbreak, Chen encouraged vendors offering live poultry slaughtering at traditional markets to sign contracts with legal slaughterhouses and change their selling practices. Customers were also advised to purchase meat products processed by legal slaughterhouses. He said that the ROC government would reimburse poultry sellers for any birds culled for carrying the virus.

During an event held by the Poultry Association of the Republic of China in early May 2013, Chen said that food processing practice in Taiwan conformed with international standards, from feeding to slaughtering and shipping, and that he also guaranteed the food safety of all of the local chickens. He himself, accompanied by Health Minister Wen-ta Chiu, ate chicken during the event to promote the sale of Taiwan poultry products.

== See also ==
- Agriculture in Taiwan
