= Taipei Botanical Garden =

Botanical garden in Taipei, Taiwan

Taipei Botanical garden
- 臺北植物園
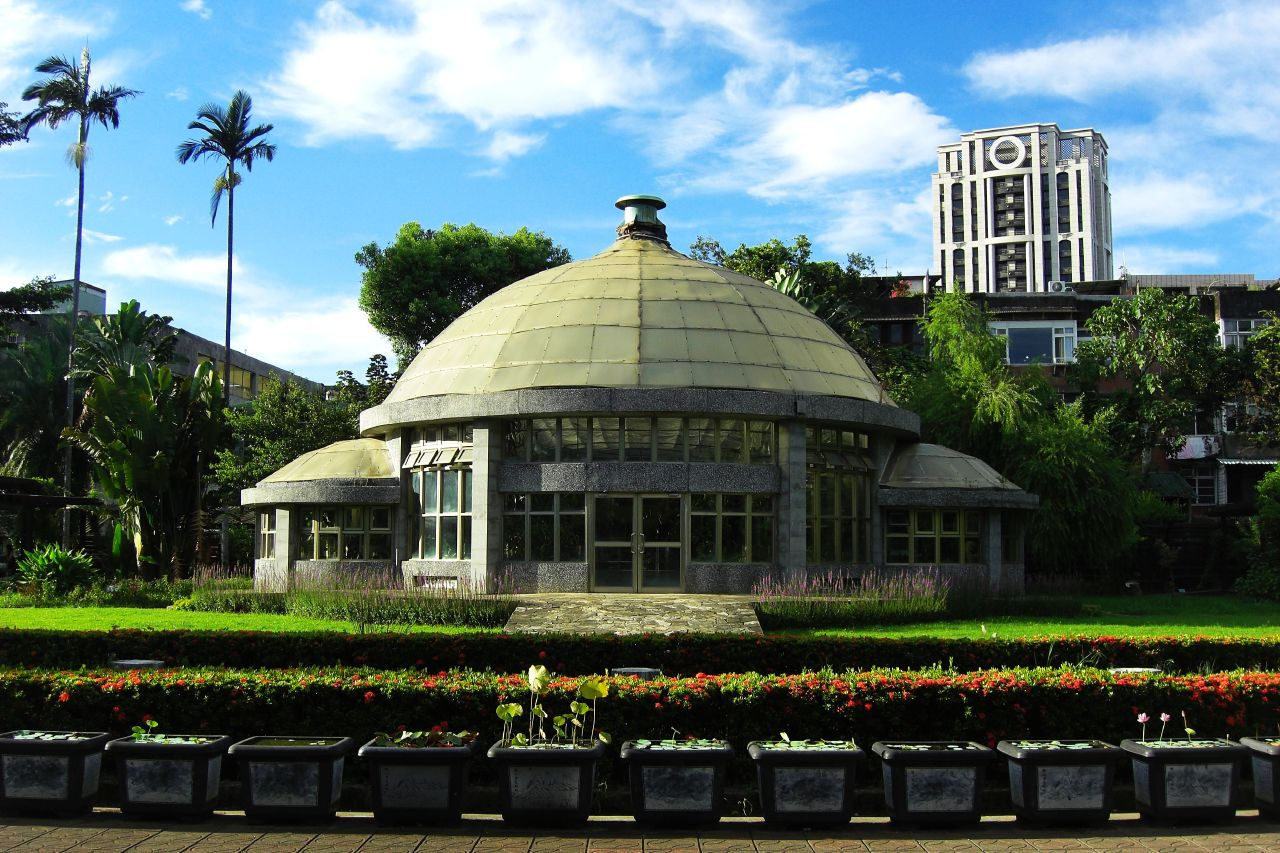
- Greenhouse at the Taipei Botanical Garden
- Interactive map of Taipei Botanical garden
- Type: Botanical garden
- Location: Zhongzheng, Taipei, Taiwan
- Coordinates: 25°1′56.23″N 121°30′34.27″E
- Created: 1896
- Established: 1921
- Operator: Taiwan Forestry Research Institute

The Taipei Botanical Garden (TPBG; Chinese: 臺北植物園; pinyin: Táiběi Zhíwùyuán) is a botanical garden located in the Nanhai Academy in Zhongzheng District, Taipei, Taiwan. Established in 1896, it covers an area of about 8 hectares and includes over 2,000 plant species.

== History ==
The Taipei Botanical Garden was originally established during Japanese rule in 1896 as a nursery. It was then officially renamed the Taihoku Botanical Garden in 1921. By 1930, there were 1,129 species in the Garden, serving largely academic research and natural sciences. Maintenance of the Garden halted during World War II. After the war, the garden was rearranged and new plants were introduced. It is currently maintained by the Taiwan Forestry Research Institute (TFRI) and has over 2,000 species of plants.

In October 2022, TFRI official Tung Gene-sheng signed memorandums of understanding with the Mlyňany Arboretum in Slovakia and Prague Botanical Garden (Botanická zahrada Praha) in the Czech Republic. As part of the partnerships, the Taipei Botanical Garden made plans to feature various Central European plant species in its gardens and work with the Prague Botanical Garden to feature Taiwanese ferns in Prague as soon as 2024.

The Taipei Botanical Garden is a member of Botanic Garden Conservation International.

=== The Project for Future Green ===
The TFRI launched an initiative called "National Botanical Gardens – the Project for Future Green" (PFS; 國家植物園方舟計畫) in 2019. The initiative adheres to the objectives set out in the Global Strategy for Plant Conservation. As of 2022, the Botanical Garden had made significant progress in reaching the goal of "At least 75 per cent of threatened plant species in ex situ collections," improving its metric from 22% in 2016 to 65% in 2022.

As part of the PFS initiative, the TFRI received a budget of NT$400 million (approximately US$13 million) over 4 years and planned to establish new Greenhouses at the Taipei Botanical Garden, originally scheduled to open in 2021.

== Grounds ==
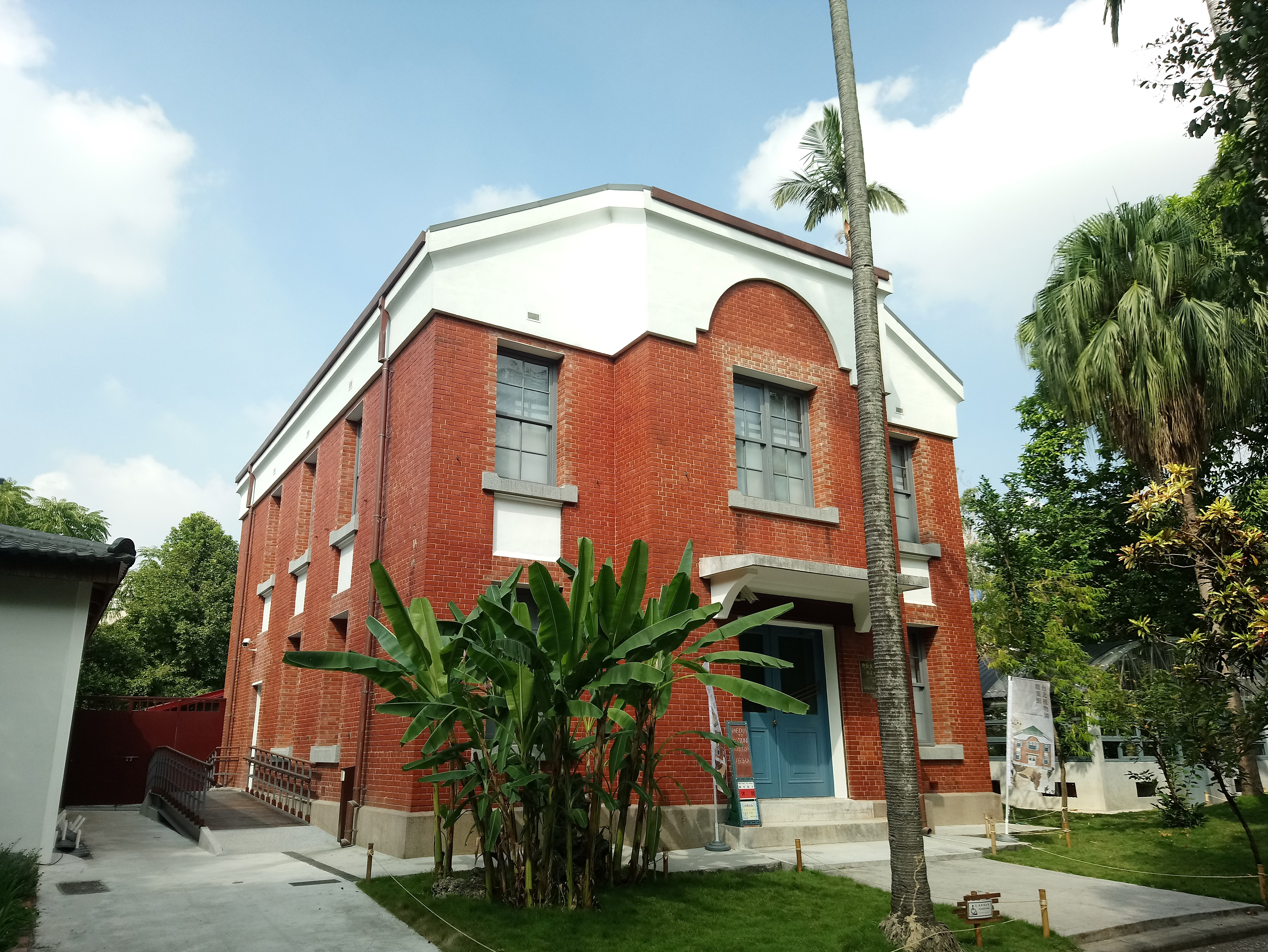
Herbarium of the Taipei Botanical Garden

There are various specialty gardens or collections in the Garden, exhibiting various plants. The 9 ponds are also designed to grow different plants. There are two buildings in the botanical garden currently listed as historical structures: a former yamen and a herbarium. The Qing Dynasty-era Guest House of Imperial Envoys was built in 1888 and relocated to the garden in 1933. The Herbarium was built in 1924 and was the first herbarium built in Taiwan. It contains more than 525,000 specimen sheets and a seed bank.

The grounds are also a location of archaeological significance as one of the earliest sites of human settlement in Taiwan.

== See also ==
- Taipei Botanical Garden metro station
- List of parks in Taiwan
- List of tourist attractions in Taiwan
