= Chen Junne-jih =

Agriculture Minister of Taiwan since 2023

- 陳駿季
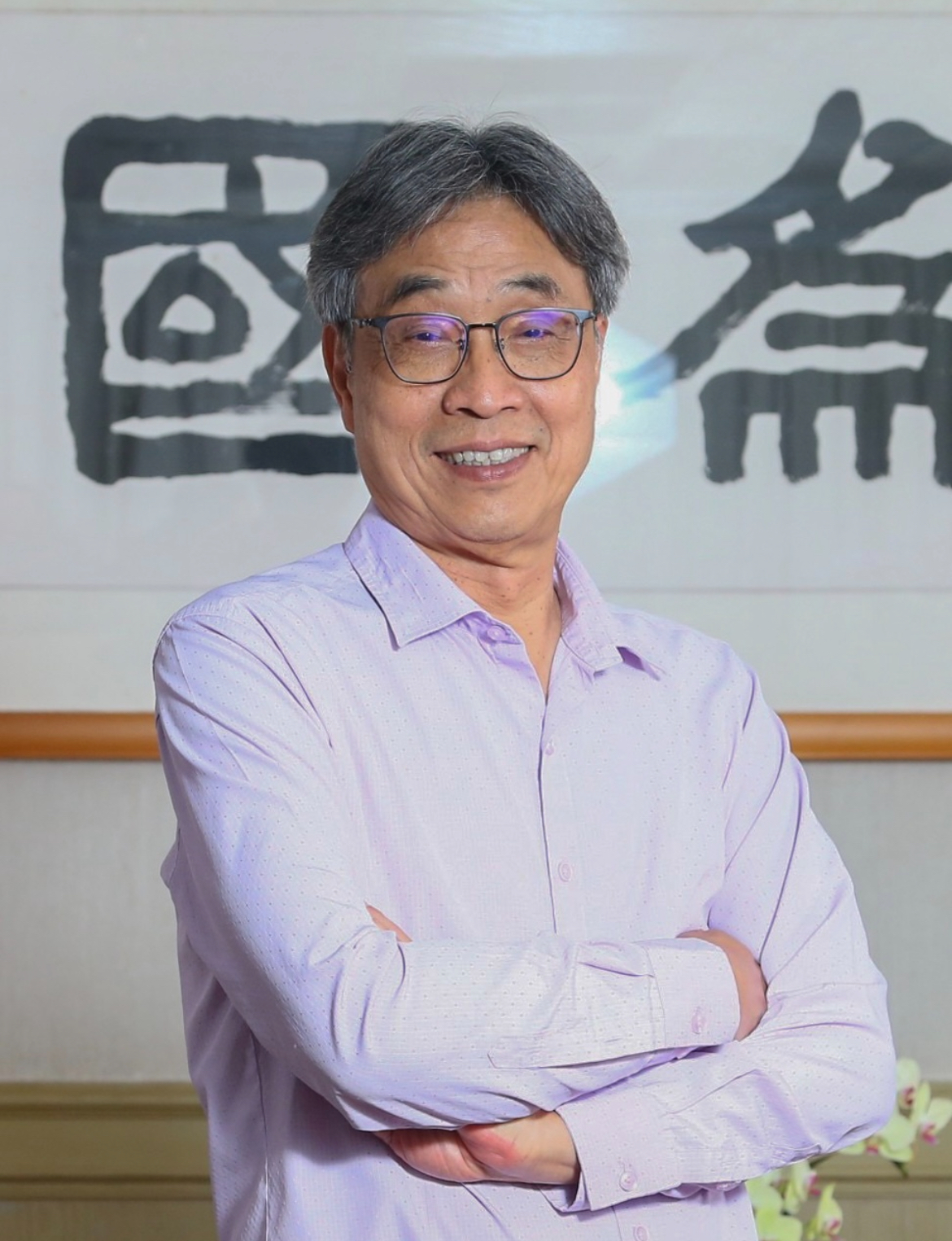
- Official portrait, 2024

2nd Minister of Agriculture
- Incumbent
- Assumed office 21 September 2023 (Note: Acting from 21 September to 20 May 2024)
- Prime Minister: Chen Chien-jen; Cho Jung-tai
- Preceded by: Chen Chi-chung

1st Deputy Minister of Agriculture
- In office 1 August 2023 – 20 May 2024
- Minister: Chen Chi-chung; Himself (acting)
- Preceded by: Ministry established (Note: Himself as Deputy Minister of the Council of Agriculture)
- Succeeded by: Hu Chung-yi
- Deputy Minister of the Council of Agriculture
- In office March 2019 – 1 August 2023
- Minister: Chen Chi-chung; Himself (acting)
- Succeeded by: Council abolished (Note: Himself as Deputy Minister of Agriculture)

Personal details
- Born: 1958 (age 67–68) Taiwan
- Party: Independent
- Education: National Chung Hsing University (BS, MS, PhD)

Chen Junne-jih (Chinese: 陳駿季; born 1958) is a Taiwanese agronomist who currently serves as the Agriculture Minister of Taiwan since 2023, first as acting and then formally appointed minister in the Cho cabinet in 2024.

== Education ==
Chen studied agricultural science at National Chung Hsing University, where he earned a bachelor's degree in agronomy in 1980, a master's degree in agronomy in 1982, and his Ph.D. in agronomy in 1990. His doctoral dissertation was titled, "A study of seed-fill physiology of Arachis hypoaea" (Chinese: 落花生種子充實之研究).

== Political career ==
Chen served for many different position in the Council of Agriculture of the Executive Yuan from 1999 to 2023.

During his career in the Council of Agriculture, he served as the associate researcher, section chief and researcher to deputy director of Taiwan Seed Improvement and Propagation Station from 1999 to 2007. And researcher, deputy director general to director general Taiwan Agricultural Research Institute from 2008 to 2019. In March 2019, Chen was appointed at the political deputy minister of the Council of Agriculture.

Following the dissolution of the Council of Agriculture and the formation of the Ministry of Agriculture in 2023, Chen was again promoted as the deputy minister of Agriculture. However, minister Chen Chi-chung resigned after one month of the formation of the Ministry of Agriculture due to the controversy over imported eggs. Chen, as the deputy minister served as acting minister until next year. During his acting ministership, he was highly acknowledged for well-explaining and processing the egg controversy. He was appointed 2nd minister of Agriculture in the Cho cabinet.
