= Guest House of Imperial Envoys =

Historic building in Taipei

Coordinates: 25°01′56″N 121°30′31″E

- 欽差行臺
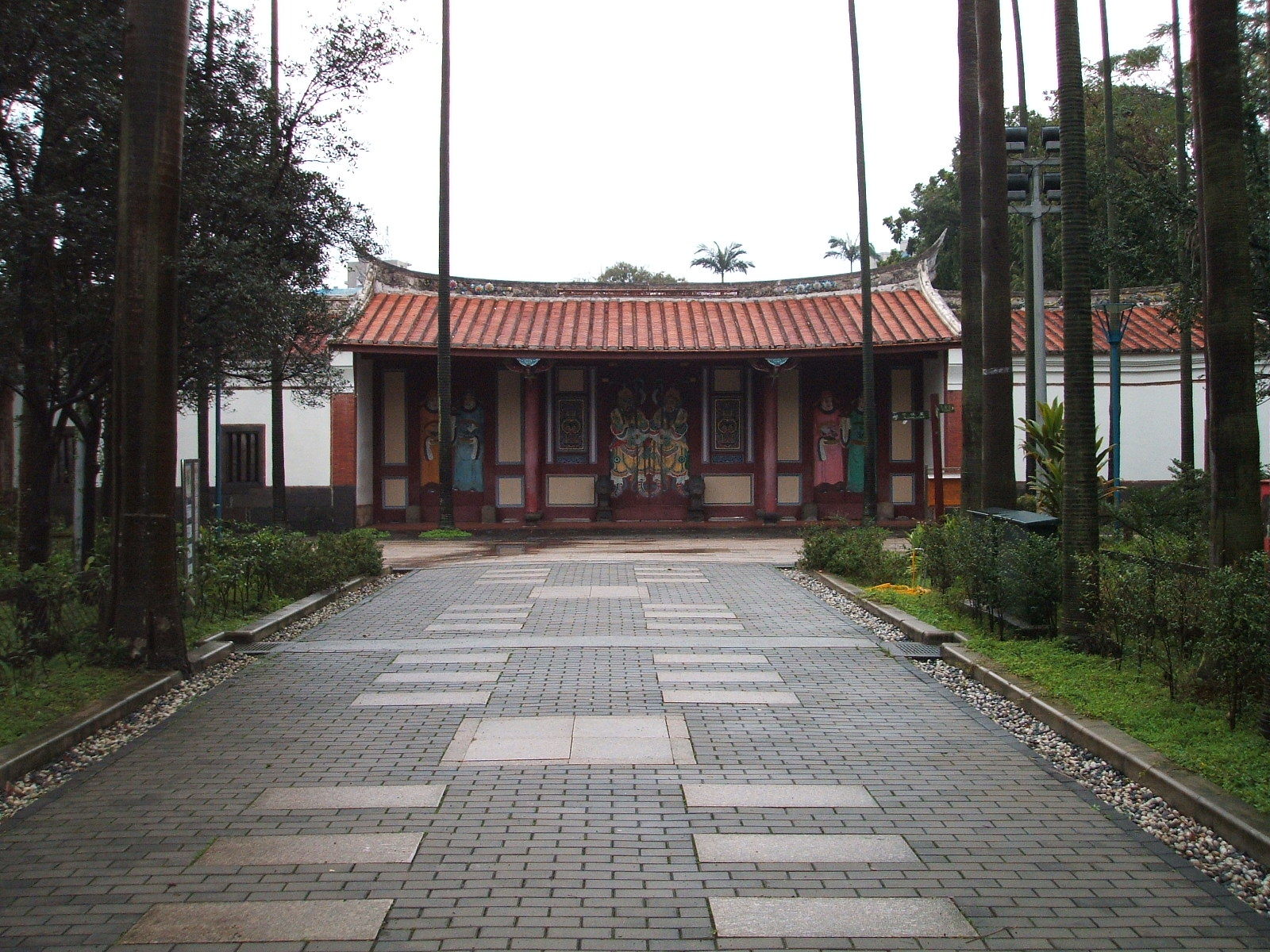

General information
- Type: Museum
- Location: Zhongzheng, Taipei, Taiwan
- Completed: 1882
- Operator: Taipei Botanical Garden

The Guest House of Imperial Envoys (Chinese: 欽差行臺; Wade–Giles: ch'in ch'ai hsing t'ai) is the former site of the Qing dynasty government guesthouse for visiting imperial envoys from the continent to Taiwan. The building is located at Taipei Botanical Garden in Zhongzheng District, Taipei. The building is the only office of the Qing dynasty remaining in Taiwan.

== History ==
The hall was built in 1882, late in the Qing period.

== Function ==
The building served as the residential quarters for Qing government officials in Taipei on their inspection visits to Taiwan.

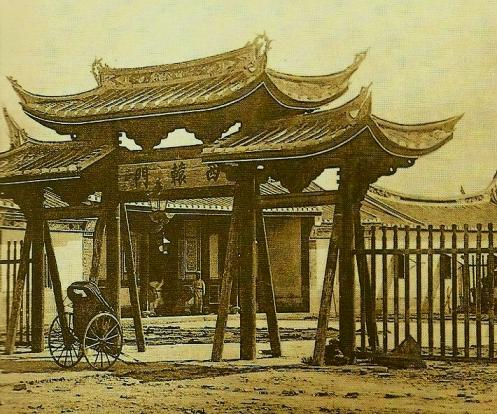
West gate of the hall under Qing rule

== Transportation ==
The building is accessible within walking distance South from Xiaonanmen Station of the Taipei Metro.

== See also ==
- List of tourist attractions in Taiwan
- Taiwan under Qing Dynasty rule
