= Tjiu Mau-ying =

Taiwanese economist (born 1936)

- 邱茂英

Minister of the Council of Agriculture
- In office 10 June 1996 – 14 May 1997
- Preceded by: Paul Sun
- Succeeded by: Peng Tso-kwei

Personal details
- Born: 1936 (age 89–90) Takao Prefecture, Taiwan, Empire of Japan (today Kaohsiung, Taiwan)
- Education: National Taiwan University (BS); University of Göttingen (PhD)
- Profession: Agricultural economist

Tjiu Mau-ying (Chinese: 邱茂英; pinyin: Qiū Màoyīng; born 1936) is a Taiwanese economist who served as Minister of the Council of Agriculture from 1996 to 1997.

Tjiu earned a Ph.D. in agricultural economics from the University of Göttingen in Germany in 1968. His doctoral dissertation was titled, "Die Agrarreform Taiwans und ihre Auswirkungen auf die wirtschaftliche Entwicklung". He led the Taiwan Provincial Government’s Department of Agriculture and Forestry, later becoming vice chairman of the Council of Agriculture. He assumed the top position at the COA on 10 June 1996 and resigned on 9 May 1997.
