= Chen Chi-chung =

Agriculture Minister of Taiwan from 2018 to 2023

- 陳吉仲
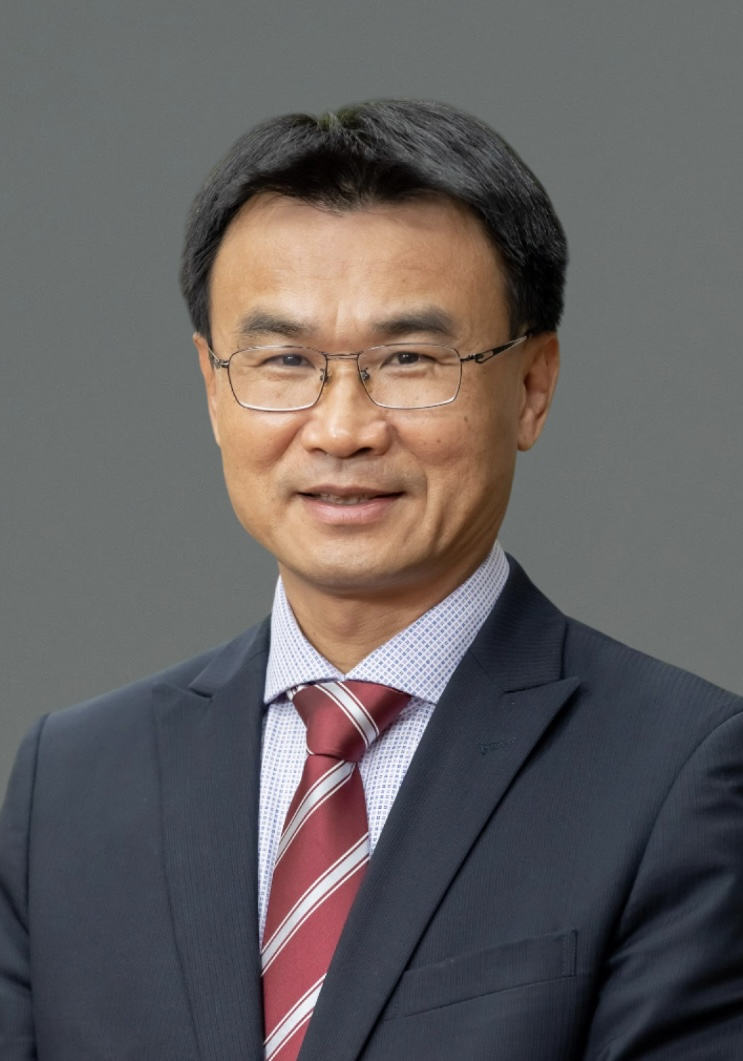
- Official portrait, 2018

1st Minister of Agriculture
- In office 1 August 2023 – 21 September 2023
- Prime Minister: Chen Chien-jen
- Preceded by: Ministry established (Note: Himself as Minister of Council of Agriculture)
- Succeeded by: Chen Junne-jih
- 15th Minister of the Council of Agriculture
- In office 4 December 2018 – 1 August 2023; Acting: 4 December 2018－13 January 2019
- Prime Minister: William Lai; Su Tseng-chang; Chen Chien-jen
- Preceded by: Lin Tsung-hsien
- Succeeded by: Council abolished (Note: Himself as Minister of Agriculture)

Deputy Minister of Council of Agriculture
- In office 20 May 2016 – 13 January 2019
- Minister: Tsao Chi-hung; Lin Tsung-hsien; Chen Chi-chung (acting)
- Succeeded by: Chen Tien-shou

Personal details
- Born: March 29, 1966 (age 60)
- Citizenship: Taiwanese
- Party: Independent
- Education: National Taiwan University (BS, MS); Texas A&M University (PhD)

Chen Chi-chung (Chinese: 陳吉仲; pinyin: Chén Jízhòng; born March 29, 1966) is a Taiwanese economist. He was the Minister of Agriculture from August 2023 to September 2023. He was previously the Minister of the Council of Agriculture between 14 January 2019 to 31 July 2023.

== Education ==
Chen graduated from National Taiwan University with a bachelor's degree in agricultural economics in 1989 and a master's degree in agricultural economics in 1994. He then earned his Ph.D. in agricultural economics from Texas A&M University in 1999. His doctoral dissertation was titled, "Development and application of a linked global trade-detailed United States agricultural sector analysis system".

== Early career ==
Chen was appointed as distinguished professor at National Chung Hsing University in 2008–2016. In 2011, he was appointed as the secretary-general of the university and served the position until 2015.

== Political career ==
In January–May 2016, he was appointed as the chairperson of Rural Economics Society of Taiwan. On 20 May 2016, he was appointed Deputy Minister of Council of Agriculture and served until 13 January 2019 before he was appointed Minister the day after. On 19 September 2023, Chen resigned from the Ministry of Agriculture.

== See also ==
- Executive Yuan
- 1450 Internet army
