= Taiwan Forestry Research Institute =

Government agency of the Republic of China

- 林業試驗所; Lîm-gia̍p Chhì-giām-só͘ (Taiwanese Pe̍h-ōe-jī); Línyè Shìyàn Suǒ (Beijing Mandarin pinyin)

Agency overview
- Formed: 6 January 1896; 1 November 1945 (as TFRI)
- Jurisdiction: Taiwan
- Headquarters: Zhongzheng, Taipei; 25°1′52.8″N 121°30′36.5″E
- Agency executive: Huang Yue-hsing, Director-General
- Parent agency: Ministry of Agriculture (Taiwan)
- Website: www.tfri.gov.tw/en/

The Taiwan Forestry Research Institute (TFRI; traditional Chinese: 林業試驗所; simplified Chinese: 林业试验所; pinyin: Línyè Shìyàn Suǒ; Pe̍h-ōe-jī: Lîm-gia̍p Chhì-giām-só͘) is a research institute under the Ministry of Agriculture of Taiwan dealing with forestry.

== History ==
The Taipei Botanical Garden was originally established as a nursery on 6 January 1896 during the Japanese era as the Taihoku Nursery. In 1911, on the foundation of Taipei Nursery, the Forestry Experimental Station was established to handle the management of forest in Taiwan. In 1921, the Japanese government unified all research institutes in Taiwan and established the Central Research Institute which included the Forestry Experimental Station but was named the Forestry Division of the Central Research Institute. In 1939, the Central Research Institute was reorganized and the Forestry Division was made independent named Forestry Research Institute.

After the handover of Taiwan from Japan to the Republic of China, it was renamed Taiwan Forestry Research Institute on 1 November 1945 and placed under the Taiwan Provincial Government. In September 1949, the research institute was transferred to the Council of Agriculture. Since then, the Council of Agriculture has been reorganized and renamed a few times under the Executive Yuan, becoming the Ministry of Agriculture in May 2023.

== Organizational structures ==
=== Technical units ===
- Botanical Garden Division
- Forest Chemistry Division
- Forest Management Division
- Forest Protection Division
- Forestry Economics Division
- Forest Utilization Division
- Silviculture Division
- Technical Service Division
- Watershed Management Division
- Wood Cellulose Division

=== Administrative units ===
- Accounting and Statistics Office
- Ethics Morality Office
- Personnel Office
- Secretariat Office

== Research centers ==
- Chungpu Research Center
- Fushan Research Center
- Hengchun Research Center
- Lienhuachih Research Center
- Lioukuei Research Center
- Taimalee Research Center

== See also ==
- Geography of Taiwan
- Taiwan Biodiversity Research Institute
