= Taiwan Biodiversity Research Institute =

Republic of China research institute

Coordinates: 23.8281°N 120.8015°E

The Taiwan Biodiversity Research Institute is a research institute under the Ministry of Agriculture (Taiwan).

== History ==
The Taiwan Biodiversity Research Institute was founded in 1992 as the Endemic Species Research Institute (TESRI). In 1999 it was moved under the Executive Yuan's Council of Agriculture. In 2023 it was transformed into the Taiwan Biodiversity Research Institute (TBRI) under the Ministry of Agriculture.

== Operations ==
The TBRI is collaborating with the Taiwan Wild Bird Federation and the Cornell Lab of Ornithology on a Taiwan Bird Atlas.

=== Taiwan Moth Information Center ===
The Taiwan Moth Information Center is a database of information on moths and butterflies maintained by the TBRI. As of 2025 it had more than 800,000 entries including 125,000 digitized specimens.

=== Taiwan Roadkill Observation Network ===
The Taiwan Roadkill Observation Network is a citizen science program run by the Taiwan Biodiversity Research Institute.

== Research ==
The TBRI has researched coconut crabs on Green Island, Taiwan.

In 2023 TBRI researchers identified two new species of spiders in Southern Taiwan, Hioctis parilarilao and Hogna arborea. In 2024 researchers identified a new Angelica species, A. aliensis. A 2025 study published by TBRI researchers identified a strong relationship between bird species diversity and landscape heterogeneity.

== Publications ==
The Institute publishes the Chinese language Nature Conservation Quarterly.

== See also ==
- List of endemic species of Taiwan
- Taiwan Agricultural Research institute
- Taiwan Forestry Research Institute
- Taiwan Livestock Research Institute
- Tea Research and Extension Station
