= Peng Tso-kwei =

Taiwanese economist (born 1947)

- 彭作奎

Minister of Council of Agriculture of the Republic of China
- In office 15 May 1997 – 6 December 1999
- Preceded by: Tjiu Mau-ying
- Succeeded by: Lin Hsiang-nung (acting); Chen Hsi-huang

Personal details
- Born: 8 February 1947 (age 79) Beipu, Hsinchu County, Taiwan
- Children: Cindy Yang
- Education: National Chung Hsing University (BS, MS); University of Illinois Urbana-Champaign (PhD)

Peng Tso-kwei (Chinese: 彭作奎; pinyin: Péng Zuòkuí; born 8 February 1947) is a Taiwanese agricultural economist who served as head of the Council of Agriculture from 1997 to 1999.

== Early life and education ==
Peng was born in Beipu, Hsinchu County, on February 8, 1947. After graduating from National Hsinchu Senior High School, he earned a B.S. in environmental engineering and an M.S. in agricultural economics from National Chung Hsing University in 1970 and 1973, respectively. He then completed doctoral studies in the United States, earning his Ph.D. in agricultural economics from the University of Illinois Urbana-Champaign in 1981. His doctoral dissertation, completed under professor Raymond M. Leuthold, was titled, "A simulation analysis of a buffer fund scheme for hogs in Taiwan".

== Political career ==
After receiving his doctorate, Peng became a professor at National Chung Hsing University.

Peng took office as head of the Council of Agriculture on 15 May 1997. In February 1998, Taiwan reached an agreement to join the World Trade Organization, but had to make adjustments unpopular with hog farmers, namely opening the nation's market to foreign meats. Peng announced short term losses for the agricultural sector in Taiwan, but vowed to aid livestock farmers. He had backed a first draft of revisions to the Agricultural Development Law as proposed in 1999, but pulled his support after the Council of Agriculture made further changes. The Kuomintang legislative caucus proposed another set of amendments, and Peng resigned his position on 6 December 1999 in protest. Peng's resignation was approved the next day and Lin Hsiang-nung was promoted as Peng's successor. After the KMT version of the bill passed the Legislative Yuan in January 2000, Peng released a statement critical of the newly promulgated law.

After the end of his tenure as head of the COA, Peng has written for the Taipei Times on the subject of agriculture. He is against the construction of housing on agricultural land, as well as the use of ractopamine in livestock.

== Academic career ==
Peng's appointment as president of National Chung Hsing University drew controversy in September 2000, as he was accused of plagiarism and subsequently investigated. Despite opposition from faculty, he took office as the president of the institution in October 2000, only to be removed from office by the Ministry of Education in January 2001. Peng became president of TransWorld Institute of Technology in February 2001. He was named a department chair at Taichung Healthcare and Management University in August 2003. In 2005, he began teaching at Asia University. He was named the president of Chung Chou University of Science and Technology in 2007. In 2010, Peng was succeeded by Hwang Jenq-Jye.

== Personal ==
Peng is of Hakka descent. His daughter was the actress Cindy Yang. She committed suicide at her Taichung home on 21 April 2015, by inhaling helium.
