= Soil and Water Conservation Bureau =

Government agency of Taiwan

Agency of Rural Development and Soil and Water Conservation
- 農業部農村發展及水土保持署
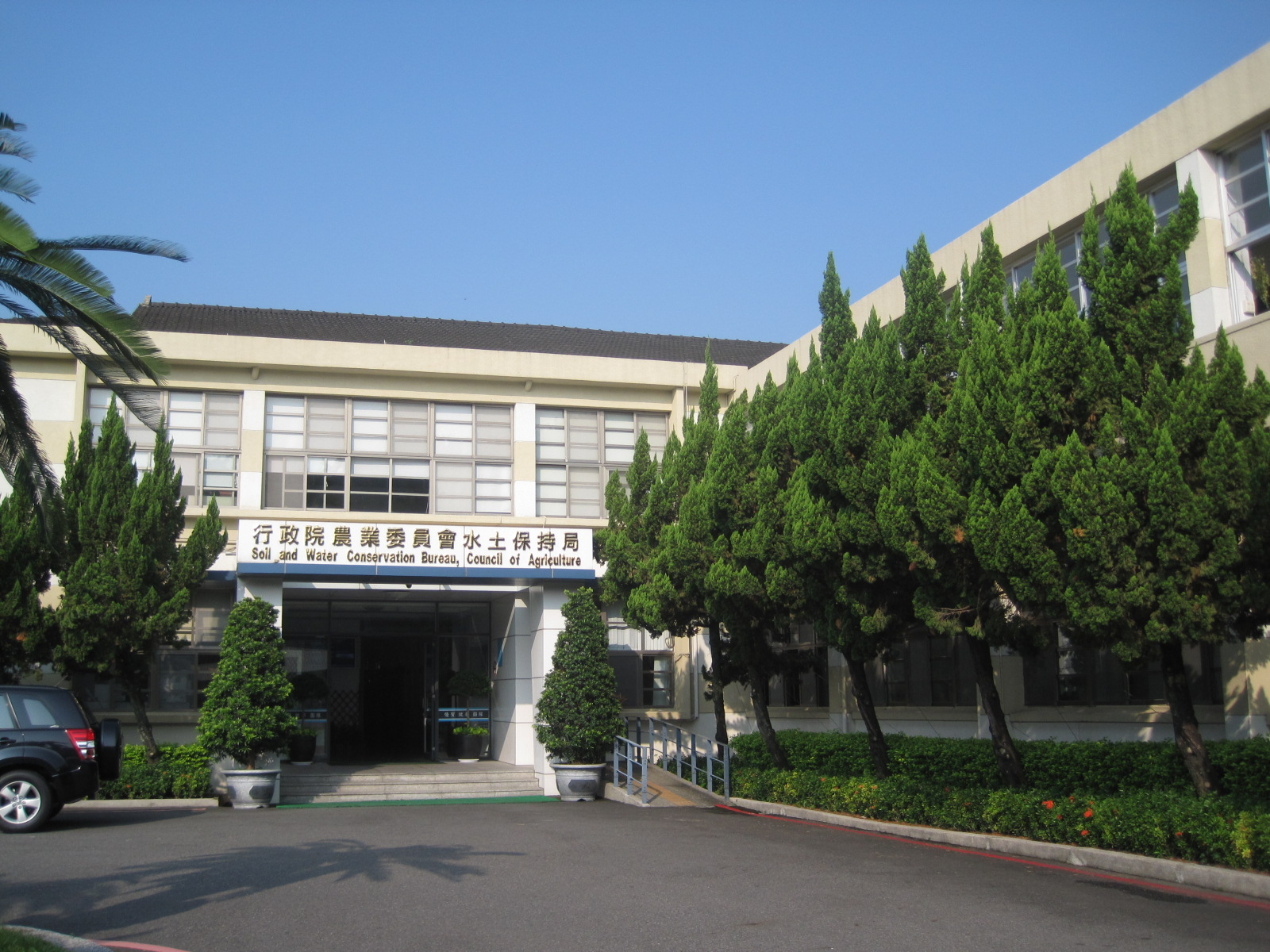

Agency overview
- Formed: 1952
- Preceding agency: China Rural Reviving United Committee
- Jurisdiction: Republic of China (Taiwan)
- Headquarters: Nantou City, Nantou County; 23°57′20.8″N 120°41′14.4″E
- Employees: 480
- Agency executive: Lee Chen-yang, Director-General
- Parent agency: Ministry of Agriculture
- Website: Official website

The Agency of Rural Development and Soil and Water Conservation (traditional Chinese: 農業部農村發展及水土保持署; simplified Chinese: 农业部农村发展及水土保持署; pinyin: Nóngyè Bù Shuǐtǔ Bǎochíjú), formerly the Soil and Water Conservation Bureau, is an agency of the Ministry of Agriculture of Taiwan (ROC) in charge of soil and water conservation, watershed management and erosion control.

== History ==
SWCB was originally established as the China Rural Reviving United Committee in 1952. In 1961, it became the Mountain Agricultural Resources Development Bureau and in 1989 it was restructured to become the Soil and Water Conservation Bureau.

== Organizational structure ==
=== Operation units ===
- Planning Division
- Watershed Conservation and Management Division
- Rural Development Division
- Monitoring and Management Division
- Debris Flow Disaster Prevention Center

=== Administrative units ===
- Secretariat Office
- Personnel Office
- Accounting Office
- Civil Service Ethics Office

== Branch offices ==
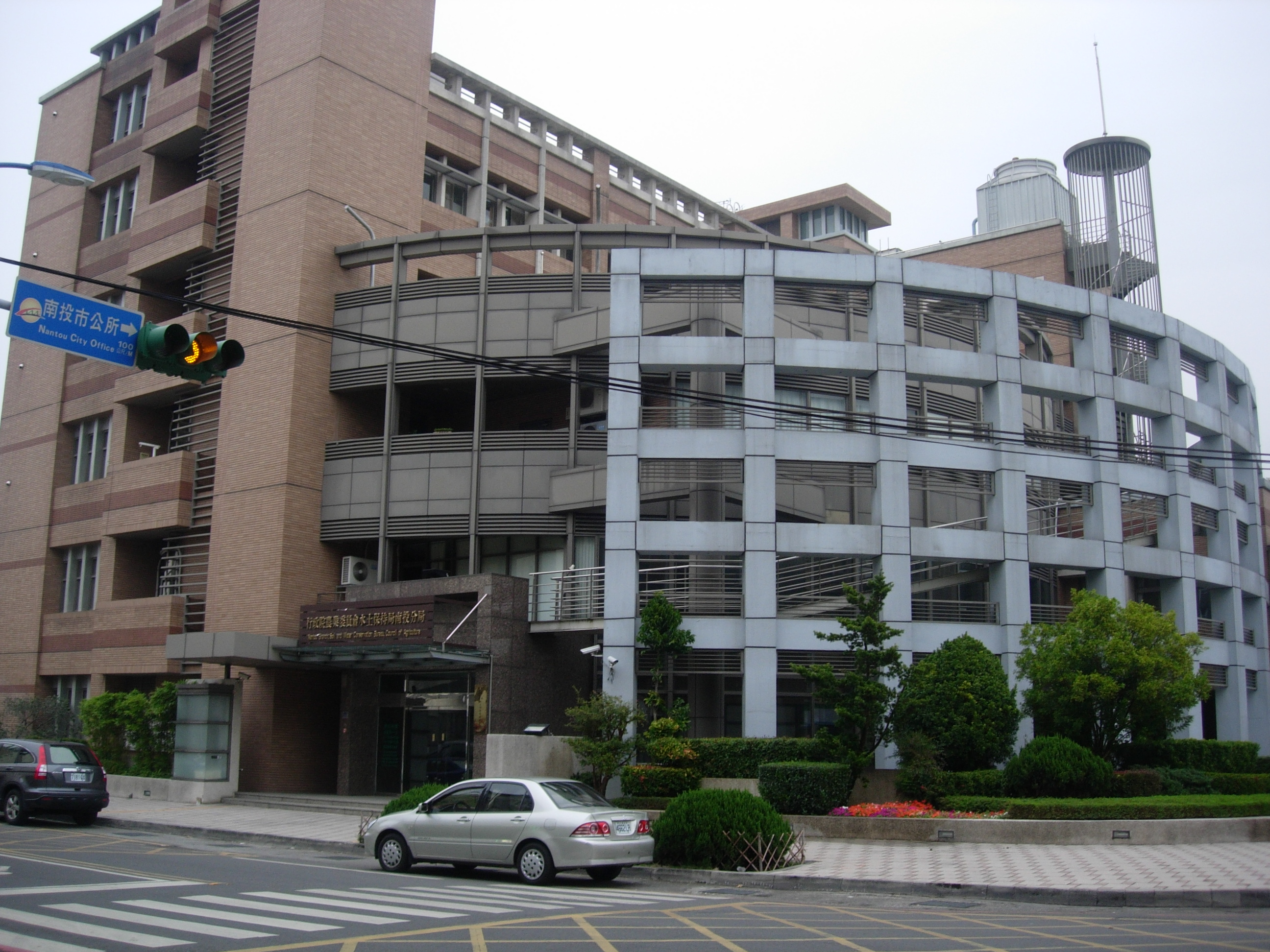
Nantou branch office

- Taipei City
- Taichung City
- Nantou County
- Tainan City
- Taitung County
- Hualien County

== List of Director-Generals ==
- Lee Chen-yang (15 January 2015 - )
- Huang Ming-Yao (30 May 2010 - 15 January 2015)
- Wu Huei-Long (2 May 2001 - 30 May 2010)
- Chen Chih-ching (16 July 1996 - 2 May 2001)

== See also ==
- Council of Agriculture (Taiwan)
