= Taiwan Livestock Research Institute =

Research center in Xinhua, Tainan, Taiwan

- 畜產試驗所
- Abbreviation: TLRI
- Formation: 1940
- Type: Research institute
- Headquarters: Xinhua, Tainan, Taiwan
- Director: Huang Jeng-fang
- Parent organization: Council of Agriculture
- Website: tlri.gov.tw

The Taiwan Livestock Research Institute (TLRI; Chinese: 畜產試驗所; pinyin: Xùchǎn Shìyàn Suǒ) is a research center in Xinhua District, Tainan, Taiwan. It conducts research on animal breeding, physiology, nutrition and feeding techniques, animal waste treatment and utilization of byproducts, animal product processing, and forage crops. The institute has cloned pigs, goats, and cows.

== History ==
The TLRI was established as a horse-breeding farm in 1940 by the Japanese government. Between 1945 and 1952, it was a horse farm under the supervision of Taiwan Provincial Government. In 1952, it was named to Hsinhua Livestock Research Branch Institute. In 1958, it was reorganized as Taiwan Livestock Research Institute under the Provincial Department of Agriculture and Forestry. It is now a unit of the central government's Council of Agriculture since 1999.

== Organizational structures ==
- Animal Industry Division
- Animal Products Processing Division
- Breeding and Genetics Division
- Forage Crops Division
- Livestock Management Division
- Nutrition Division
- Physiology Division
- Technical Service Division

== See also ==
- Taiwan Biodiversity Research Institute
