= Robert C. T. Lee =

Robert C. T. Lee (Chinese: 李崇道; pinyin: Lǐ Chóngdào; Wade–Giles: Li Ch'ung-tao) (October 2, 1923 – May 15, 2016), was a Chinese and later Taiwanese veterinarian and politician.

== Biography ==
Lee was born in Shanghai, Republic of China, with his ancestral hometown in Suzhou, Jiangsu. His brother is the physicist and Nobel Prize laureate Tsung-Dao Lee.

Lee finished his undergraduate study in Guangxi, and continued his graduate studies in the United States. He received his PhD in veterinary medicine from Cornell University in New York. Lee went back to China and became a technician in the Republic of China Ministry of Agriculture and Forestry.

Later on Lee went to teach in universities, and was professor of veterinary medicine at National Taiwan University and later at National Chung Hsing University. In August 1981, Lee became the President of National Chung Hsing University.

Lee was also in several important positions in Taiwan, including:

- Secretary-general of the Council of Agriculture of the Executive Yuan,
- May 1973, Director-general of the Council of Agriculture of the Executive Yuan,
- September 1984, Commissioner of the Examination Yuan,
- 1989, the first Director of the College Entrance Examination Center (大學入學考試中心),
- November 1989, Advisor of the Office of the President, Republic of China (中華民國總統府國策顧問),
- 1991, Vice-president of the Academia Sinica.

After retirement, he resided in College Station, TX until his death.
