= Taiwan Agricultural Research institute =

Research institute in Taiwan

- Parent institution: Ministry of Agriculture (Taiwan)
- Founder: Government-General of Taiwan
- Established: 1895
- Head: Lin Hsueh-shih (林學詩)
- Location: Wufeng District, Taichung, Taiwan
- Website: www.tari.gov.tw/english/

The Taiwan Agricultural Research institute is a research institute in Taiwan under the auspices of the Ministry of Agriculture.

== History ==
The Taiwan Agricultural Research institute (TARI) was founded in 1895 by the Government-General of Taiwan during Japanese rule.

== Research ==
=== Watermelon ===
TARI began to study watermelon in the 1950s and has developed numerous varieties.

=== Pineapple ===
TARI has engaged in significant pineapple breeding since the Japanese colonial period with the Tainung No. 1 being introduced in 1934. The variety Tainung No. 23 (bred from Tainung No. 19 and Tainung No. 21) smells like mangos and is well adapted to Taiwan's environment.

=== Green onion ===
In 2019 TARI released a heat tolerant green onion variety intended to allow farmers in the south of Taiwan to produce green onions in the summer.

=== Sweet potato ===
Research into the sweet potato at the Chiayi research station began in 1922.

In 1991 the World Vegetable Center (WVC) chose to end its sweet potato research due to high costs and other institutions with a tighter focus coming into existence. The WVC duplicated and transferred its research and germplasm to the International Potato Center and Taiwan Agricultural Research institute.

=== Strawberry ===
The institute has developed a bruise resistant variety of strawberry called Tainung No. 1.

=== Coffee ===
A hybrid coffee plant adpted for Taiwanese conditions was released in 2025 as Tainung No. 1.

== Facilities ==
- Chiayi Agricultural Experiment Station
- Fengshan Tropical Horticultural Experiment Branch
- The Taiwan Agricultural Research institute maintains a "doomsday bunker" hardened against military attack which houses samples of all crops grown in Taiwan

== See also ==
- Agriculture in Taiwan
- World Vegetable Center
- Taiwan Banana Research Institute
- Taiwan Sugar Research Institute
- Tea Research and Extension Station
- Taiwan Biodiversity Research Institute
