= Yu Yu-hsien =

- 余玉賢

Minister of Council of Agriculture of the Republic of China
- In office July 1988 – November 1992
- Preceded by: Wang You-tsao
- Succeeded by: Paul Sun

Personal details
- Born: 16 October 1934 Taiwan, Empire of Japan
- Died: 20 June 1993 (aged 58)
- Education: National Chung Hsing University (BS, MS); Oregon State University (MA); Purdue University (PhD)

Yu Yu-hsien (Chinese: 余玉賢; 1934–1993) was a Taiwanese economist.

Born in 1934 in Taiwan Province, Yu earned a doctorate in agricultural economics from Purdue University. He was appointed to lead the Taiwan Provincial Government Department of Agriculture and Forestry in December 1981. In this position, Yu developed an advertising campaign to increase the rate of consumption of fruits grown in Taiwan, and decrease waste resulting from overproduction. He accomplished the same for excess rice, by reallocating land to be used for growing other grains. Yu was named agriculture minister in July 1988, and retained his office when Hau Pei-tsun assumed the premiership in 1990. Paul Sun replaced Yu in November 1992.
