= Chen Hsi-huang =

Taiwanese economist and agronomist

- 陳希煌

Minister of the Council of Agriculture
- In office 20 May 2000 – 31 January 2002
- Preceded by: Lin Hsiang-nung (acting); Peng Tso-kwei
- Succeeded by: Fan Chen-tsung

Personal details
- Born: 18 December 1935 (age 90) Taihoku, Taiwan, Empire of Japan
- Education: National Taiwan University (BS); University of Georgia (MS, PhD)
- Profession: Agriculturalist

Chen Hsi-huang (Chinese: 陳希煌; born 18 December 1935) is a Taiwanese economist and agronomist who served as Minister of Agriculture from 2000 to 2002.

== Early life and education ==
Chen was born in Taipei (then known as Taihoku) on December 18, 1935. He graduated from National Taiwan University with a bachelor's degree in agricultural economics, then pursued doctoral studies in the United States. He earned a Master of Science (M.S.) in 1971 and his Ph.D. in 1974, both in agricultural economics and applied economics from the University of Georgia College of Agricultural and Environmental Sciences.

== Career ==
Chen worked for the Sino-American Joint Commission on Rural Reconstruction, a predecessor organization to the Council of Agriculture, upon his return to Taiwan. In 2000, he took office as head of the Minister of Agriculture. In this position, Chen was responsible for long-term disaster relief efforts resulting from the 1999 Jiji earthquake. He organized a disaster prevention center after a June 2000 aftershock, and worked to stop mudflows from causing further damage. Chen also ordered a six-year initiative to reduce the number of betel nut plantations in order to lessen the effects of soil erosion caused by betel nut trees. During his tenure as COA leader, Chen supported the work of rural credit cooperatives geared toward farmers and fishermen, and sought to lift restrictions on Chinese employees of Taiwanese fishermen. After Typhoon Toraji hit Taiwan in July 2001, Nantou County legislator Tsai Huang-liang stated that Chen's policies unfairly burdened betel nut producers, making them scapegoats for erosion. Chen recognized that Nantou County should be reforested to prevent future typhoon damage, but rejected a proposal to use helicopters, stating that there were more effective ways to seed the mountainous area. It was reported that Chen would step down from the COA in January 2002, and he was eventually succeeded by Fan Chen-tsung.
