= Yuan Chiung-chiung =

Taiwanese writer

- 袁瓊瓊
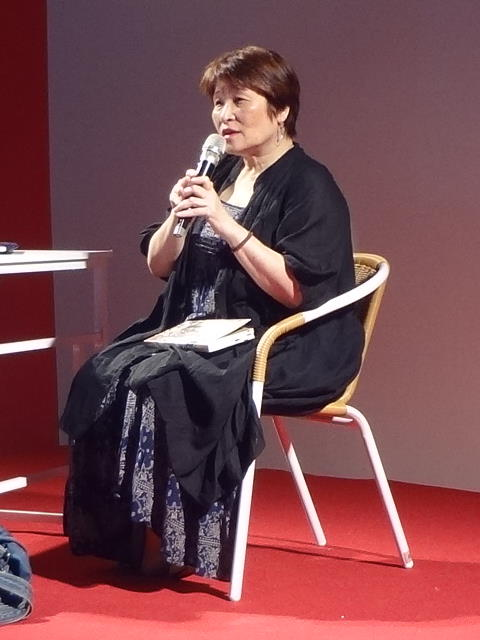
- Born: 25 November 1950 (age 75); Taiwan
- Occupations: novelist, essayist, screenwriter, poet
- Writing career
- Genre: Romance

Yuan Chiung-chiung (Chinese: 袁瓊瓊; pinyin: Yuán Qióngqióng; Wade–Giles: Yüan^{2} Chʻiung^{2}-chʻiung^{2}; born 25 November 1950) is a Taiwanese writer whose family originated in Meishan, Sichuan, China. Yuan wrote poetry, fiction, essays, screenplays and television scripts during the Boudoir literature period for women. Boudoir literature is a form of writing that focuses on issues of women.

Some of the issues that Yuan focused on are: women's role in family and the workplace, and their anxieties, romantic relationships and aspirations. Yuan was inspired by the writings of an influential Chinese writer named Eileen Chang, who was seen as the leader of the liberation for female Taiwanese writers. Both Yuan and her predecessor Chang wrote love stories that battled stereotypes of women.

== Writings ==
As Yuan exposed the role of women in their families, workplace, and other aspects of life, the women in her stories typically accomplished a financial feat. Either they achieved financial independence, or she showed the financial prosperity of the flourishing middle-class. Her writings attempt to demonstrate what women can do independent from men.

In contrast to Eileen Chang, who depicted the differences between social classes in China in a negative light, Yuan was raised in a middle-class family and did not show any animosity towards the economical differences in society, especially since the majority of the Taiwanese people have achieved middle-class status in post-war years. In fact, Yuan greatly enjoyed her middle-class life and often showed that appreciation through her literature.

Many of Yuan's stories end on a question and the plot is left unresolved. Her more recent work often deals with young people trying to resolve their inner conflict with an external experience.

== Works ==
- A Lover's Ear
- Spring Water Boat 《春水船》
- A Sky of One's Own 《自己的天空》
- Fantasy Bug
- Flies
- Cat
- Adversity
- Even-Glow
- Beyond Words
- The Old House That Stood for 30 Years
- A Place of One's Own
- The Sky's Escape
- Tales of Taipei
- The Mulberry Sea 《滄桑》(1984)
- Empty Seat

== Sources ==
- Sudden Fiction International, Shapard, Robert, Thomas, James. New York, NY: 1989, pp 336.
- Literary Culture in Taiwan, Sung-sheng Yvonne Chang, West-Sussex, NY: 2004, pp 171–175.
- Yuan Chiung-chiung and the Rage of Eileen Zhang Among Taiwan's Feminine Writers: The Eileen Zhang Phenomenon, Sung-sheng Yvonne Chang
