= Ministry of Agriculture (Taiwan) =

Government ministry of the Republic of China

- 農業部; Nóngyè Bù (Mandarin); Lông-gia̍p-pō͘ (Taiwanese); Nùng-ngia̍p Phu (Hakka)
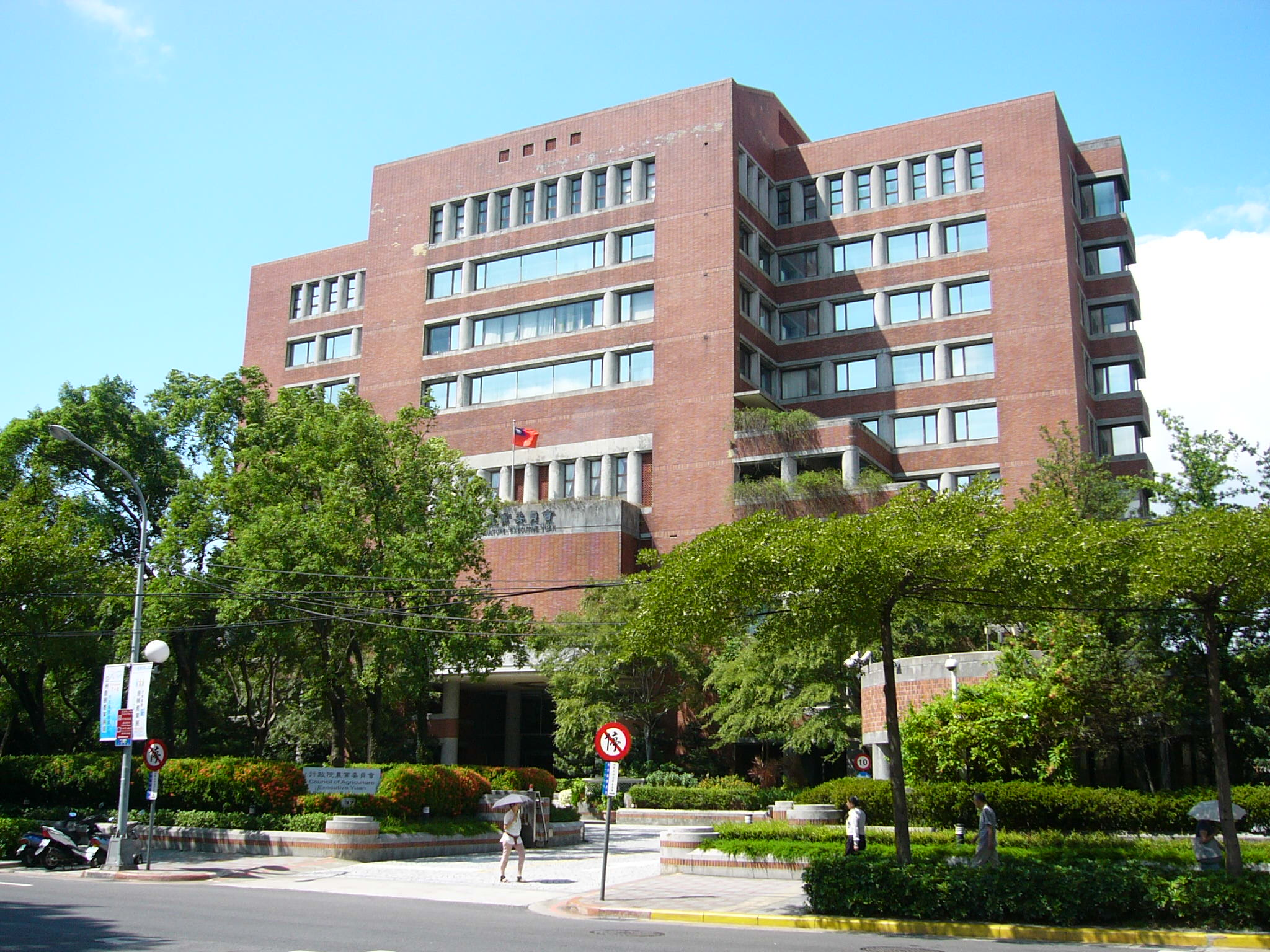
- Ministry of Agriculture HQ

Agency overview
- Formed: 1912 (as Ministry of Basic Industries); 1984 (as Council of Agriculture); 2023 (as Ministry of Agriculture)
- Preceding agencies: Agriculture Bureau; Council for Agricultural Planning and Development
- Jurisdiction: Government of the Republic of China
- Headquarters: Zhongzheng, Taipei
- Ministers responsible: Chen Junne-jih, Minister; Chen Tain-shou, Tu Wen-jane, Deputy Ministers
- Website: www.moa.gov.tw

The Ministry of Agriculture (MOA; Chinese: 農業部; pinyin: Nóngyè Bù; Pe̍h-ōe-jī: Lông-gia̍p-pō͘) of Taiwan, formerly the Council of Agriculture, is the ministry under the Executive Yuan of the Republic of China (Taiwan) in charged with overseeing affairs related to agriculture, forestry, fishery, animal husbandry and food affairs. The COA is actively participating various FAO-led activities.

== History ==
In 1912, the Ministry of Basic Industries was created after the establishment of the Provisional Government of the ROC. The ministry was in charge for agriculture, forestry, industry and commerce in China. After the Beiyang Government was established in the same year, the ministry was divided into two office, one is to oversee the agriculture and forestry, and the other is to oversee the industry and commerce. In 1914, the two offices reemerged to become the Ministry of Agriculture and Commerce. In 1925, the Ministry of Basic Industries was installed but renamed to Ministry of Agriculture and Fishery. In 1930, the Ministry of Agriculture and Fishery and Ministry of Industry and Commerce were combined to form the Ministry of Basic Industries. In 1938, the ministry was changed to Ministry of Economic Affairs with the Department of Agriculture and Forestry was placed under it. In 1940, the department was expanded to become Ministry of Agriculture and Forestry. In 1941, the ministry was changed to Agriculture and Forestry Administration.

On the other hand, there was the Sino-American Joint Commission on Rural Reconstruction (JCRR) established in Nanking in 1948. After the Kuomintang's defeat in the Chinese Civil War in 1949, which saw the government evacuated to Taiwan, the JCRR moved there. That same year, the Department of Agriculture was created under the Ministry of Economic Affairs (MOEA) in which it was later renamed to Department of Agriculture and Forestry. In November 1981, the Department of Agriculture and Forestry was upgraded to Agriculture Bureau of the MOEA.

In 1978, the JCRR was changed to the Council for Agricultural Planning and Development (CAPD) under the Executive Yuan. On 20 July 1984, both of the CAPD and the Agriculture Bureau were merged to become the Council of Agriculture. In May 2022, the Executive Yuan approved the proposal to upgrade the council to the status of a ministry. In May 2023 the Organization Act of the Ministry of Agriculture was passed by the Legislative Yuan.

== Organization structures ==
- Department of Planning
- Department of Animal Industry
- Department of Farmers’ Services
- Department of International Affairs
- Department of Science and Technology
- Department of Irrigation and Engineering
- Secretariat
- Personnel Office
- Accounting Office
- Civil Service Ethics Office
- Legal Affairs Committee
- Petitions and Appeals Committee
- Information Management Center

== Agencies ==
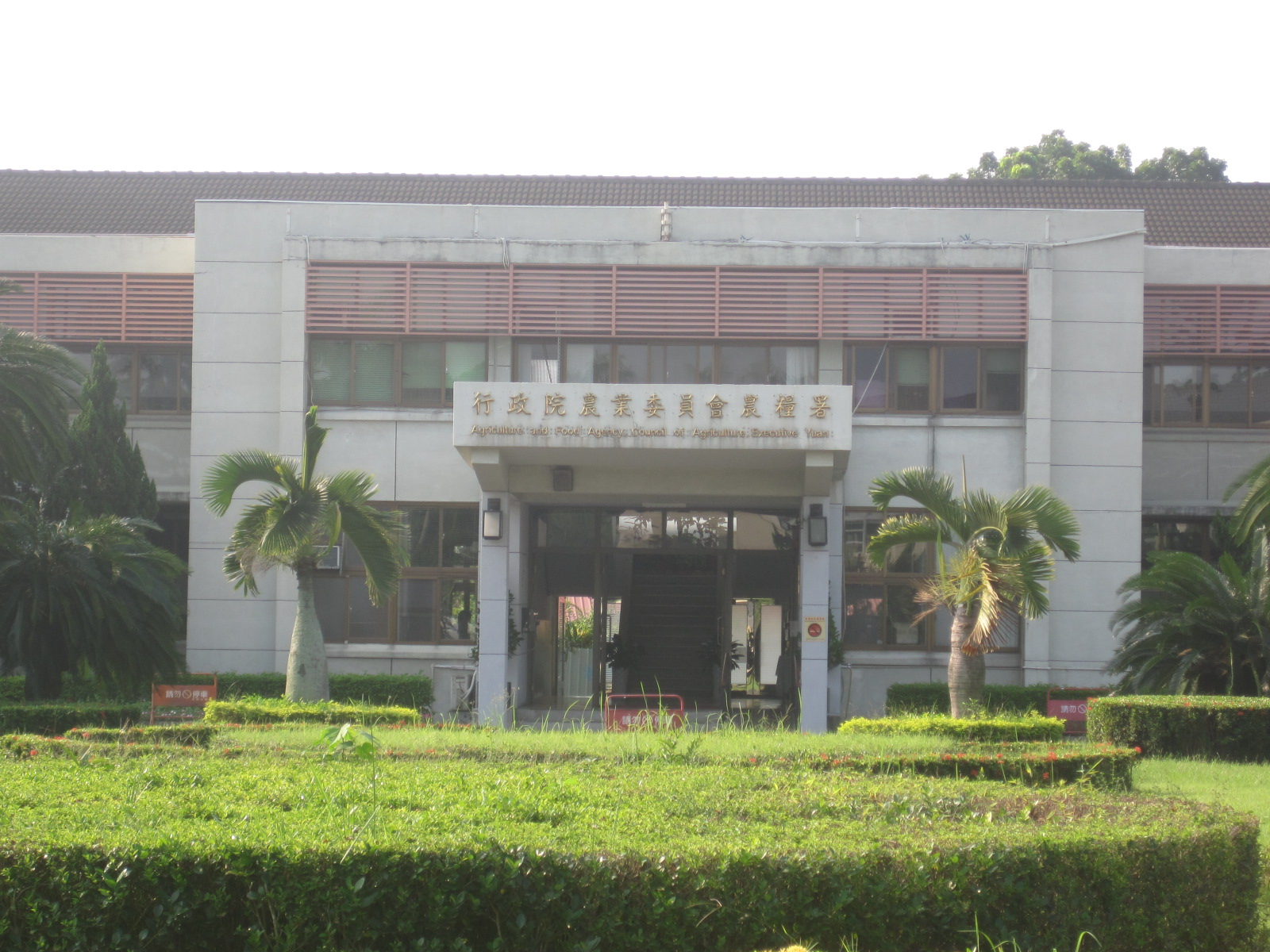
Agriculture and Food Agency

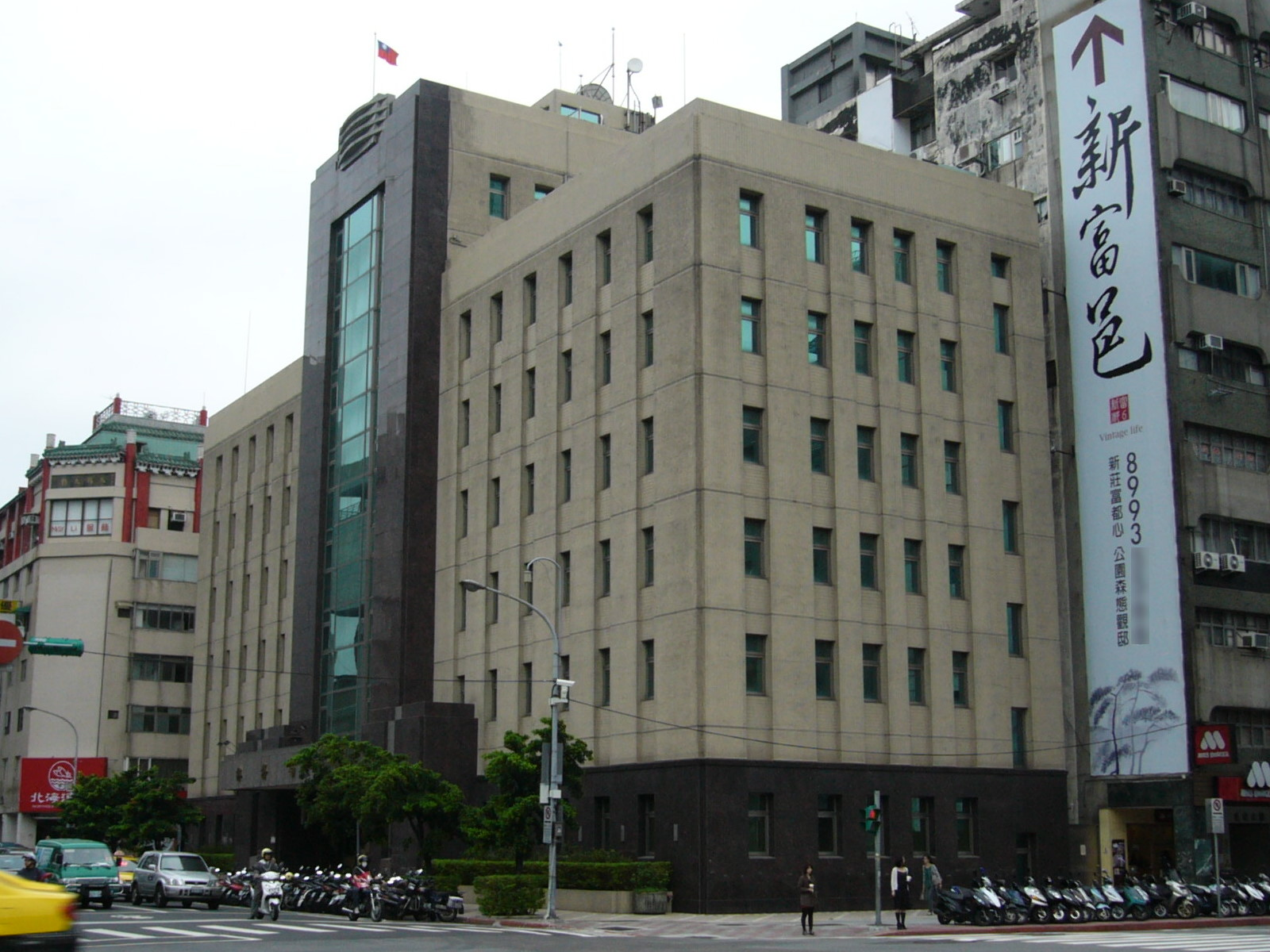
Forestry and Nature Conservation Agency

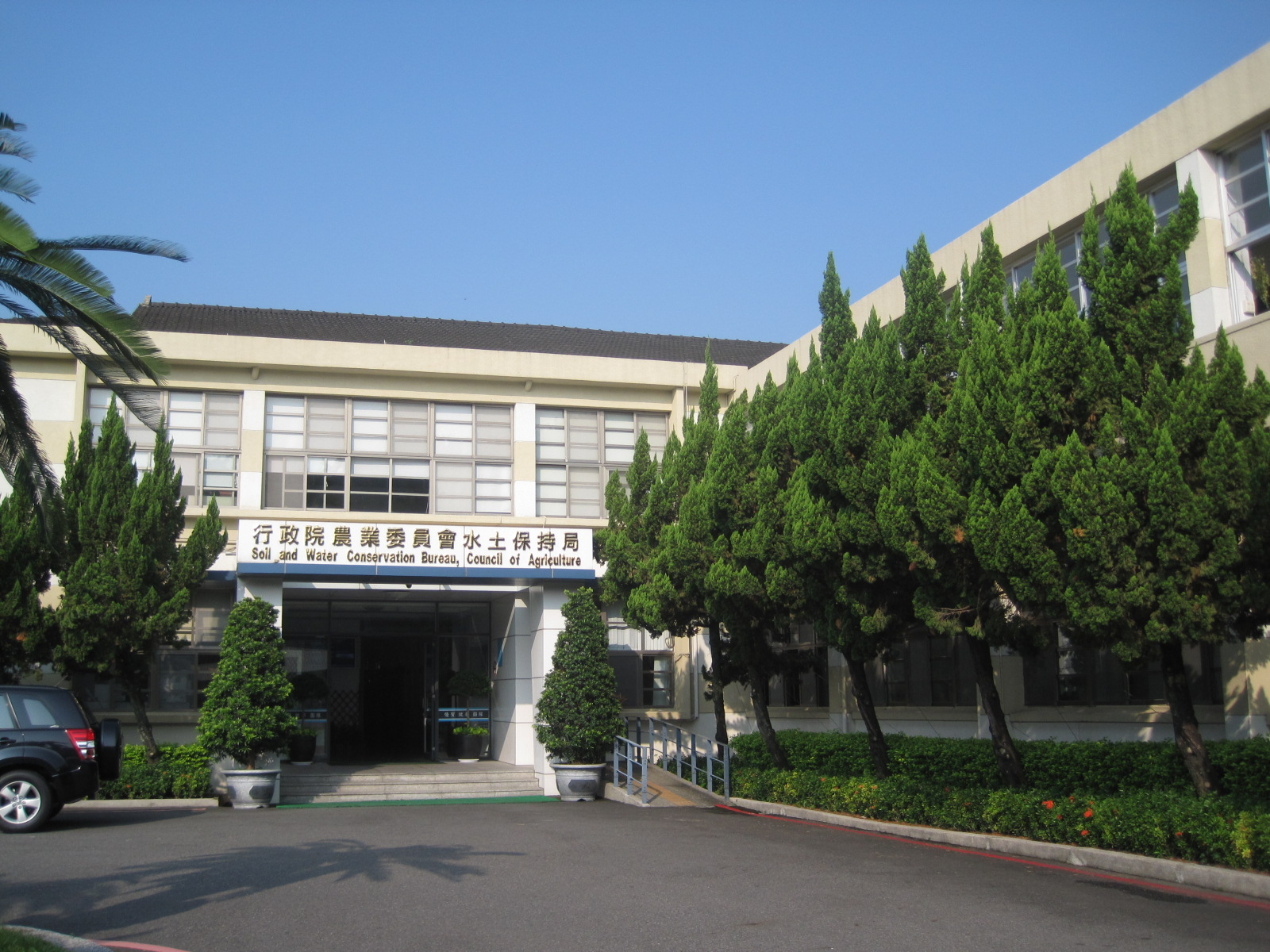
Agency of Rural Development and Soil and Water Conservation

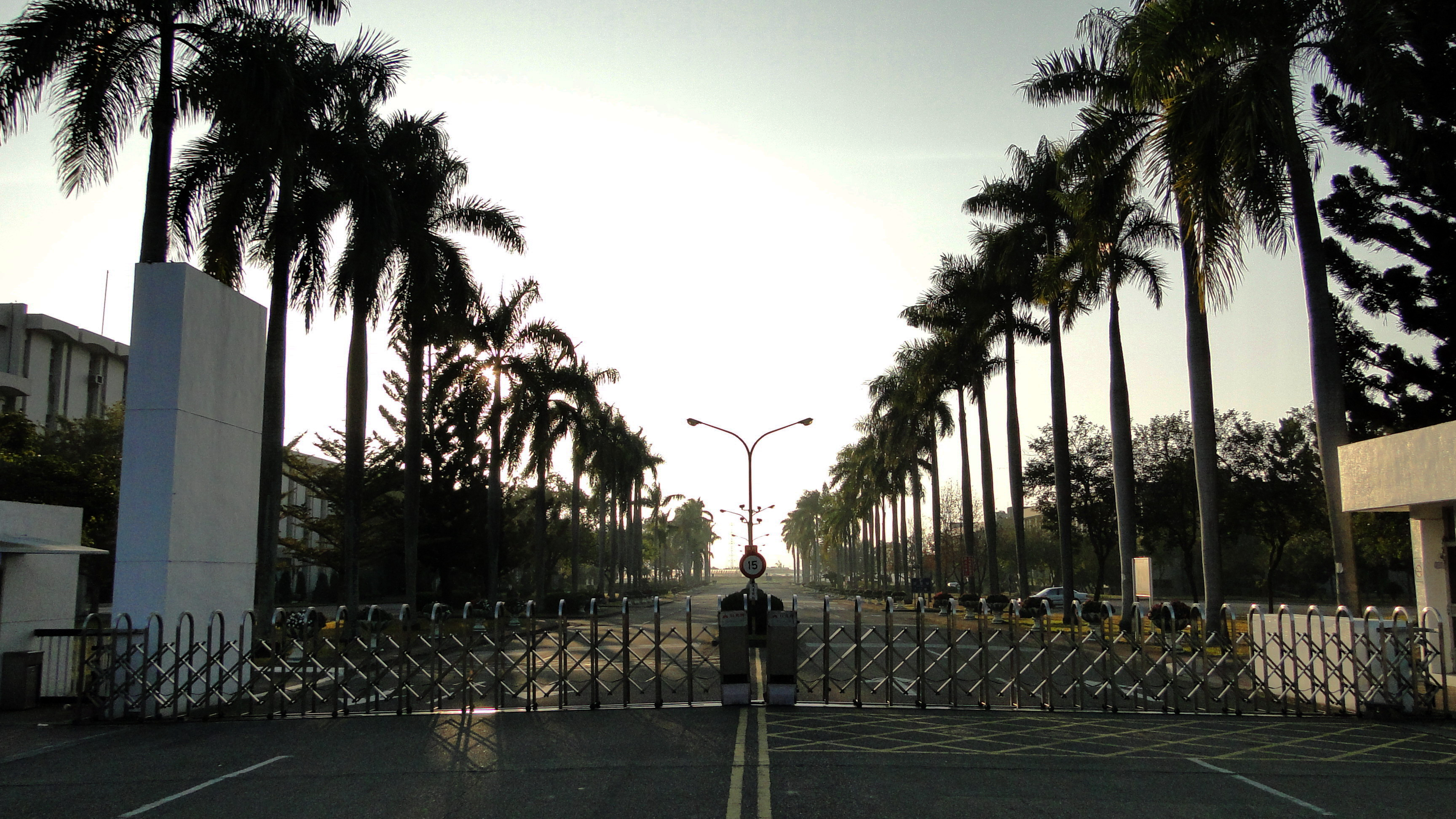
Taiwan Agricultural Research institute

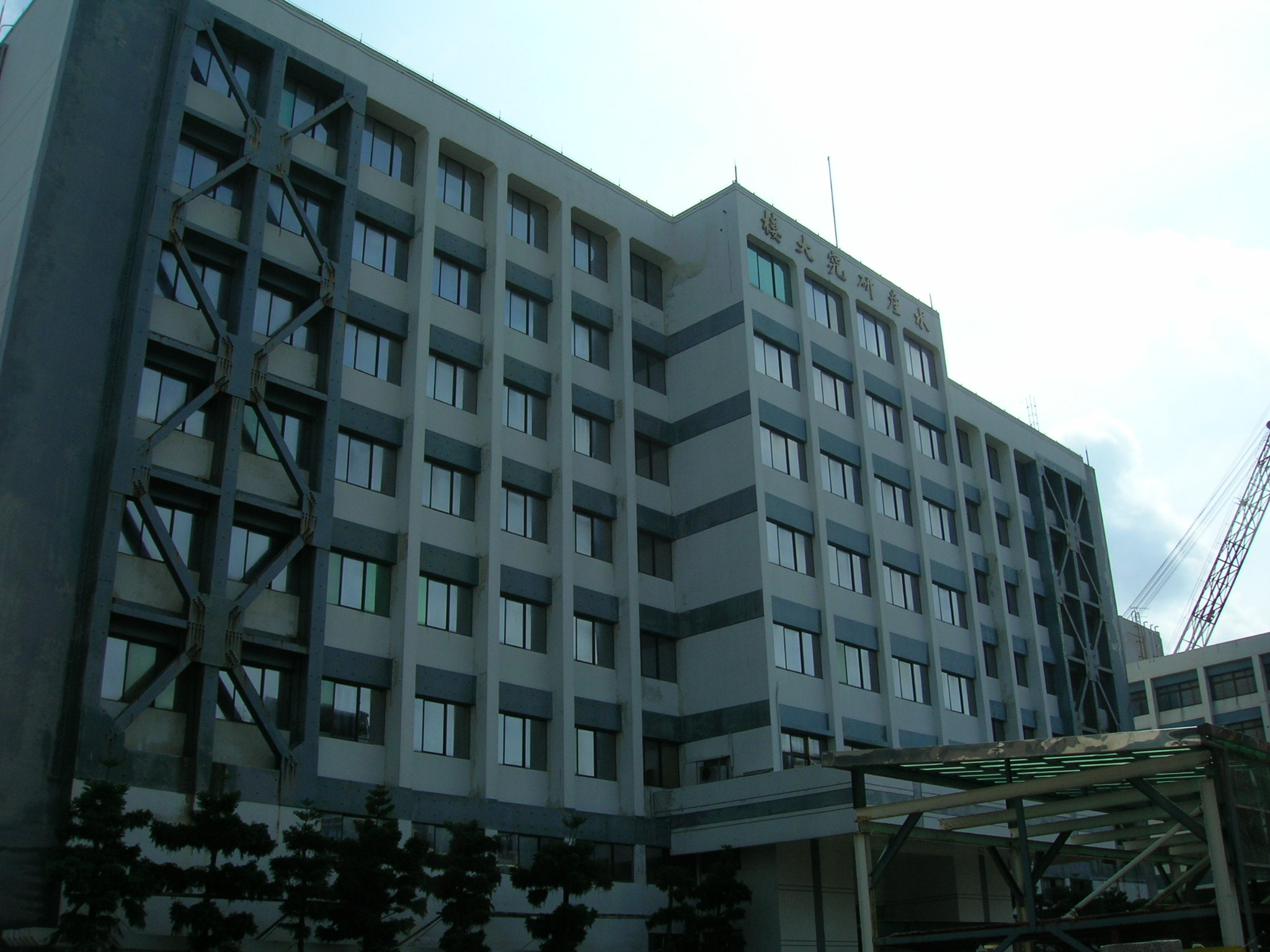
Fisheries Research Institute

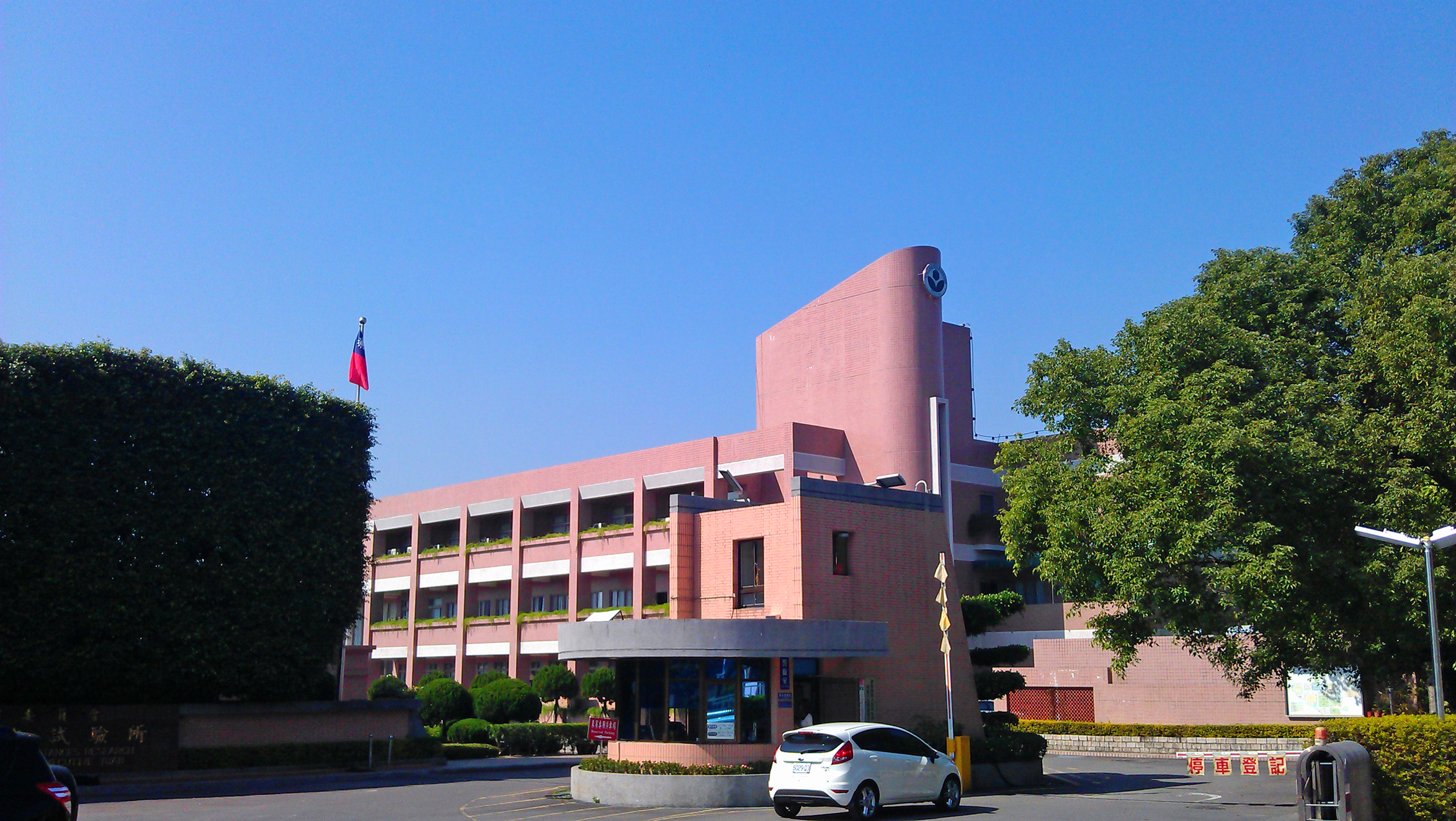
Taiwan Agricultural Chemicals and Toxic Substances Research Institute

- Agriculture and Food Agency
  - North Region Branch
  - Central Region Branch
  - Southern Region Branch
  - Eastern Region Branch
- Fisheries Agency
- Animal and Plant Health Inspection Agency
  - Keelung Branch
  - Hsinchu Branch
  - Taichung Branch
  - Kaohsiung Branch
- Agricultural Finance Agency
- Forestry and Nature Conservation Agency
  - Luodong Forest District Office
  - Hsinchu Forest District Office
  - Dongshi Forest District Office
  - Nantou Forest District Office
  - Chiayi Forest District Office
  - Pingtung Forest District Office
  - Taitung Forest District Office
  - Hualien Forest District Office
  - Aerial Survey Office
- Agency of Rural Development and Soil and Water Conservation
  - First Engineering Office
  - Second Engineering Office
  - Third Engineering Office
  - Fourth Engineering Office
  - Fifth Engineering Office
  - Sixth Engineering Office
- Irrigation Agency
- Agricultural Technology Park Administration Center
- Taiwan Agricultural Research institute
- Taiwan Forestry Research Institute
- Fisheries Research Institute
- Taiwan Livestock Research Institute
  - Taitung Animal Propagation Station
- Veterinary Research Institute
  - Animal Drugs Inspection Branch
- Taiwan Agricultural Chemicals Research Institute
- Taiwan Biodiversity Research Institute
- Taoyuan District Agricultural Research and Extension Station
- Miaoli District Agricultural Research and Extension Station
- Taichung District Agricultural Research and Extension Station
- Tainan District Agricultural Research and Extension Station
- Kaohsiung District Agricultural Research and Extension Station
- Hualien District Agricultural Research and Extension Station
- Tea Research and Extension Station
- Taiwan Seed Improvement and Propagation Station

== Ministers ==
Political Party: Kuomintang Democratic Progressive Party Non-partisan/ unknown

No.	Name	Term of Office		Days	Party	Premier
Minister of the Sino-American Joint Commission on Rural Reconstruction
1	Jiang Menglin (蔣夢麟)	October 1948	August 1964		Kuomintang	Weng Wenhao; Sun Fo; He Yingqin; Yan Xishan; Chen Cheng I Yu Hung-Chun; Chen Cheng II; Yen Chia-kan
2	Shen Tsung-han (沈宗瀚)	August 1964	May 1973			Yen Chia-kan; Chiang Ching-kuo
3	Robert C. T. Lee (李崇道)	May 1973	March 1979			Chiang Ching-kuo; Sun Yun-suan
Minister of Council for Agricultural Planning and Development (since 16 March 1979)
1	Robert C. T. Lee (李崇道)	March 1979	August 1981			Sun Yun-suan
2	Chang Hsien-chiu (張憲秋)	August 1981	June 1984			Sun Yun-suan; Yu Kuo-hua
3	Wang You-tsao (王友釗)	June 1984	September 1984			Yu Kuo-hua
Minister of Council of Agriculture (since July 1984)
1	Wang You-tsao (王友釗)	September 1984	July 1988			Yu Kuo-hua
2	Yu Yu-hsien (余玉賢)	July 1988	November 1992			Yu Kuo-hua; Lee Huan; Hau Pei-tsun
3	Paul Sun (孫明賢)	November 1992	June 1996			Hau Pei-tsun; Lien Chan
4	Tjiu Mau-ying (邱茂英)	10 June 1996	14 May 1997	338		Lien Chan
5	Peng Tso-kwei (彭作奎)	15 May 1997	6 December 1999	935		Lien Chan; Vincent Siew
—	Lin Hsiang-nung (林享能)	6 December 1999	19 May 2000	164	Kuomintang	Vincent Siew
6	Chen Hsi-huang (陳希煌)	20 May 2000	31 January 2002	621		Tang Fei; Chang Chun-hsiung I
7	Fan Chen-tsung (范振宗)	1 February 2002	2 December 2002	304	Democratic Progressive Party	Yu Shyi-kun
8	Lee Chin-lung (李金龍)	3 December 2002	24 January 2006	1451		Yu Shyi-kun; Frank Hsieh
9	Su Jia-chyuan (蘇嘉全)	25 January 2006	19 May 2008	845	Democratic Progressive Party	Su Tseng-chang I Chang Chun-hsiung II
10	Chen Wu-hsiung (陳武雄)	20 May 2008	5 February 2012	1356	Kuomintang	Liu Chao-shiuan; Wu Den-yih
11	Chen Bao-ji (陳保基)	6 February 2012	31 January 2016	1455	Kuomintang	Sean Chen; Jiang Yi-huah; Mao Chi-kuo
12	Chen Chih-ching (陳志清)	1 February 2016	19 May 2016	108	Kuomintang	Chang San-cheng
13	Tsao Chi-hung (曹啟鴻)	20 May 2016	7 February 2017	263	Democratic Progressive Party	Lin Chuan
14	Lin Tsung-hsien (林聰賢)	8 February 2017	3 December 2018	663	Democratic Progressive Party	Lin Chuan; William Lai
—	Chen Chi-chung (陳吉仲)	4 December 2018	13 January 2019	40		William Lai
15	Chen Chi-chung (陳吉仲)	14 January 2019	31 July 2023	1659		Su Tseng-chang II; Chen Chien-jen
Minister of Agriculture (since August 2023)
1	Chen Chi-chung (陳吉仲)	1 August 2023	20 September 2023	50		Chen Chien-jen
—	Chen Junne-jih (陳駿季)	21 September 2023	20 May 2024	242		Chen Chien-jen
2	Chen Junne-jih (陳駿季)	20 May 2024	Incumbent	810		Cho Jung-tai

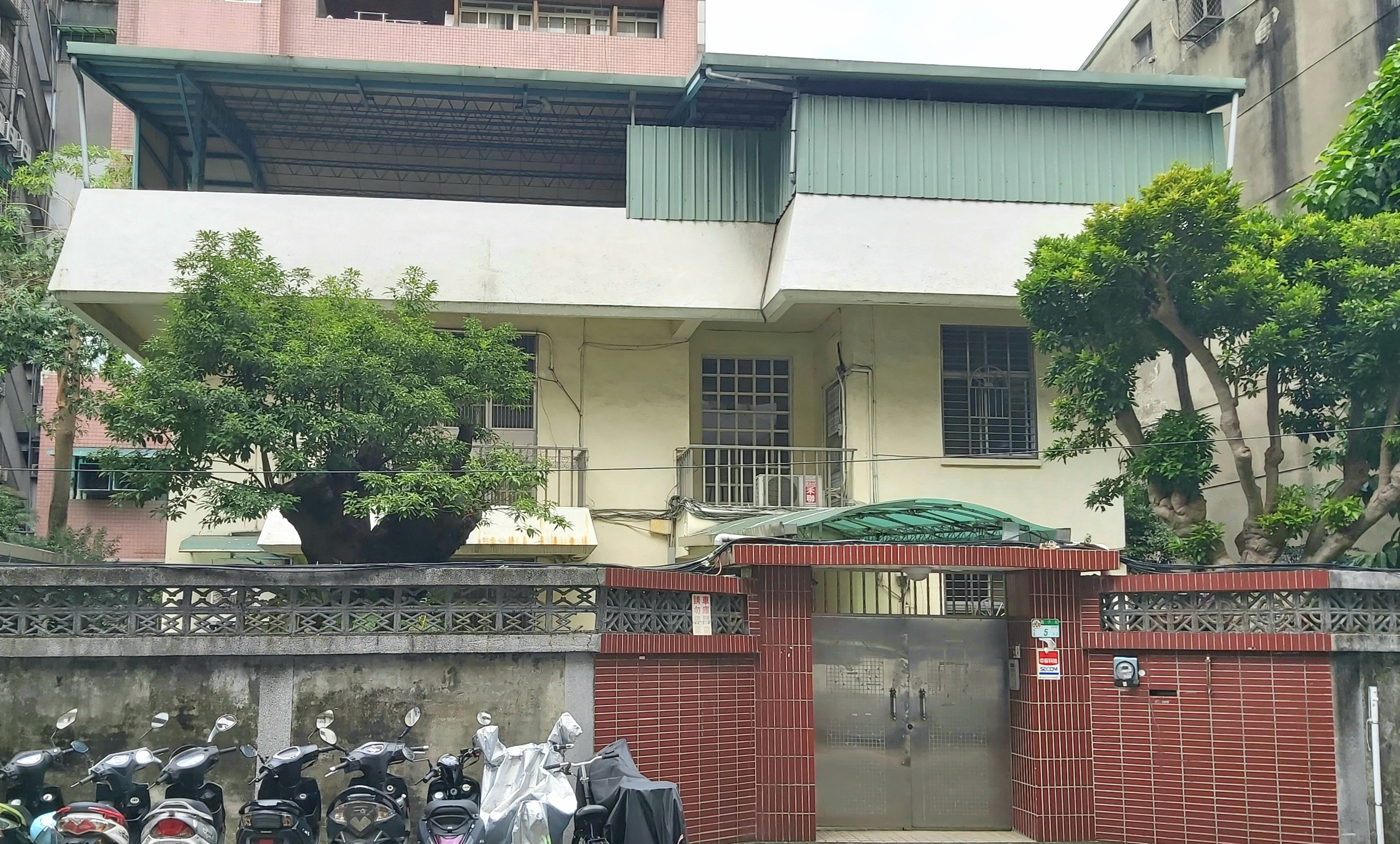
Official residence of Minister of Agriculture in Taipei.

== Operations ==
The Ministry of Agriculture is tasked with ensuring many aspects of Taiwan's food security including in the event of war, this includes ensuring a legally mandated three month supply of rice. Reserve food supplies are dispersed around the country to make attacking them more difficult.

== Access ==
The ministry building is accessible within walking distance West from Chiang Kai-shek Memorial Hall Station of the Taipei Metro.

== See also ==
- Agriculture in Taiwan
- Economy of Taiwan
- 1450 Internet army, also kown as Council of Agriculture funding Internet army
