= Lin Hsiang-nung =

Taiwanese politician and diplomat

- 林享能

Minister of Council of Agriculture of the Republic of China
- In office 6 December 1999 – 19 May 2000
- Preceded by: Peng Tso-kwei
- Succeeded by: Chen Hsi-huang

Personal details
- Born: 1936 (age 89–90) Mino, Kizan, Takao Prefecture, Taiwan, Empire of Japan, (today Meinong District, Kaohsiung, Taiwan)
- Party: Kuomintang
- Education: National Chengchi University (BS); Chinese Culture University (MA)

Lin Hsiang-nung (Chinese: 林享能; pinyin: Lín Xiǎngnéng; born 1936) is a Taiwanese politician and diplomat.

== Early life and education ==
Lin was born in 1936. A native of Kaohsiung, he attended National Chengchi University and Chinese Culture University.

== Political career ==
Lin worked for the Ministry of Foreign Affairs for 25 years, and was based in Latin America. He also served as secretary to Lien Chan before assuming a vice-ministerial role at the Council of Agriculture in 1989. Lin was promoted in 1999 to succeed Peng Tso-kwei as agriculture minister. Upon taking office, Lin expressed support for revisions to the Agricultural Development Law proposed by Peng. However, shortly afterward, Lin proposed a new set of regulations regarding the zoning of farmland. The Legislative Yuan eventually voted to allow individual farmers to build structures on newly-acquired farmland. Shortly before leaving the Council of Agriculture, Lin joined Lien Chan's 2000 presidential campaign. He stepped down when the Chen Shui-bian administration was sworn into office and later worked for the National Policy Foundation, a Kuomintang think tank. By the 2004 election cycle, Lin had been named the leader of the Kuomintang's Kaohsiung headquarters and worked to coordinate a joint presidential ticket with the People First Party. After Chen Shui-bian won a second presidential term, Lin led a protest outside the Kaohsiung District Prosecutors' Office. He sought agricultural support for the KMT in the 2005 local elections by organizing the Taiwan Tractor Team.
