= World Vegetable Center =

Agricultural research institute in Tainan, Taiwan

- Formation: 1971
- Type: Nonprofit
- Purpose: Vegetable research and development
- Headquarters: 60 Yi-Min Liao, Shanhua, Tainan, Taiwan
- Region served: Worldwide
- Director General: Marco Wopereis
- Website: avrdc.org

The World Vegetable Center (WorldVeg) (Chinese: 亞蔬—世界蔬菜中心), previously known as the Asian Vegetable Research and Development Center (AVRDC), is an international, nonprofit institute for vegetable research and development. It was founded in 1971 in Shanhua, southern Taiwan, by the Asian Development Bank, Taiwan, South Korea, Japan, the Philippines, Thailand, the United States and South Vietnam.

WorldVeg aims to reduce malnutrition and alleviate poverty in developing nations through improving production and consumption of vegetables.

== History ==
The World Vegetable Center was founded as the Asian Vegetable Research and Development Center (AVRDC) in 1971 by the Asian Development Bank, Taiwan, South Korea, Japan, the Philippines, Thailand, the United States and South Vietnam. The main campus was opened in 1973. In 2008 the center was rebranded as the World Vegetable Center.

For the first 20 years of its existence the World Vegetable Center was a major global sweet potato research center with over 1,600 accessions in their first two years of operation. In 1991 the World Vegetable Center chose to end its sweet potato research due to high costs and other institutions with a tighter focus coming into existence. The WVC duplicated and transferred its research and germplasm to the International Potato Center and Taiwan Agricultural Research institute.

== Research and development ==
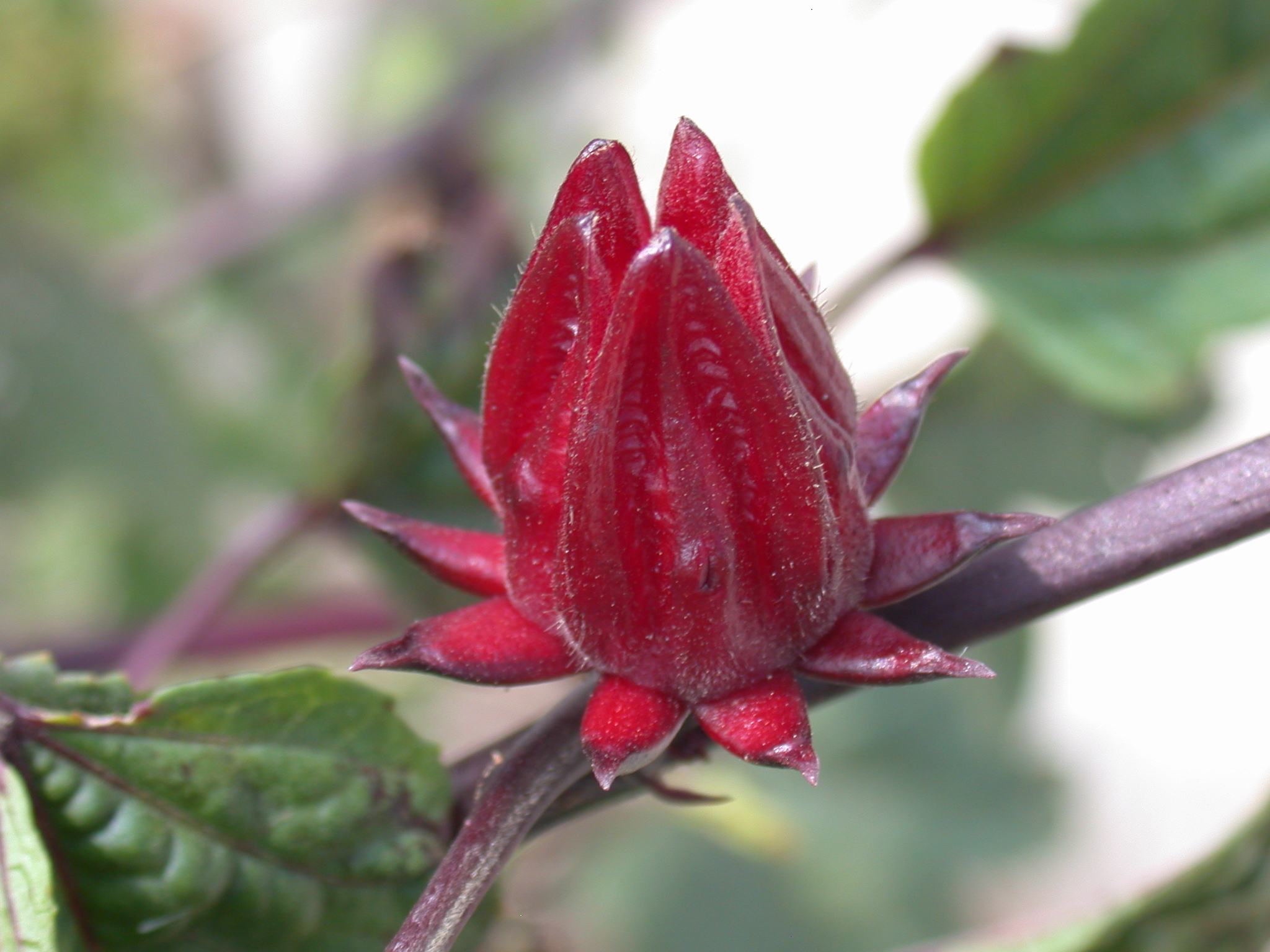
Roselle (Hibiscus sabdariffa), a traditional vegetable high in vitamin C

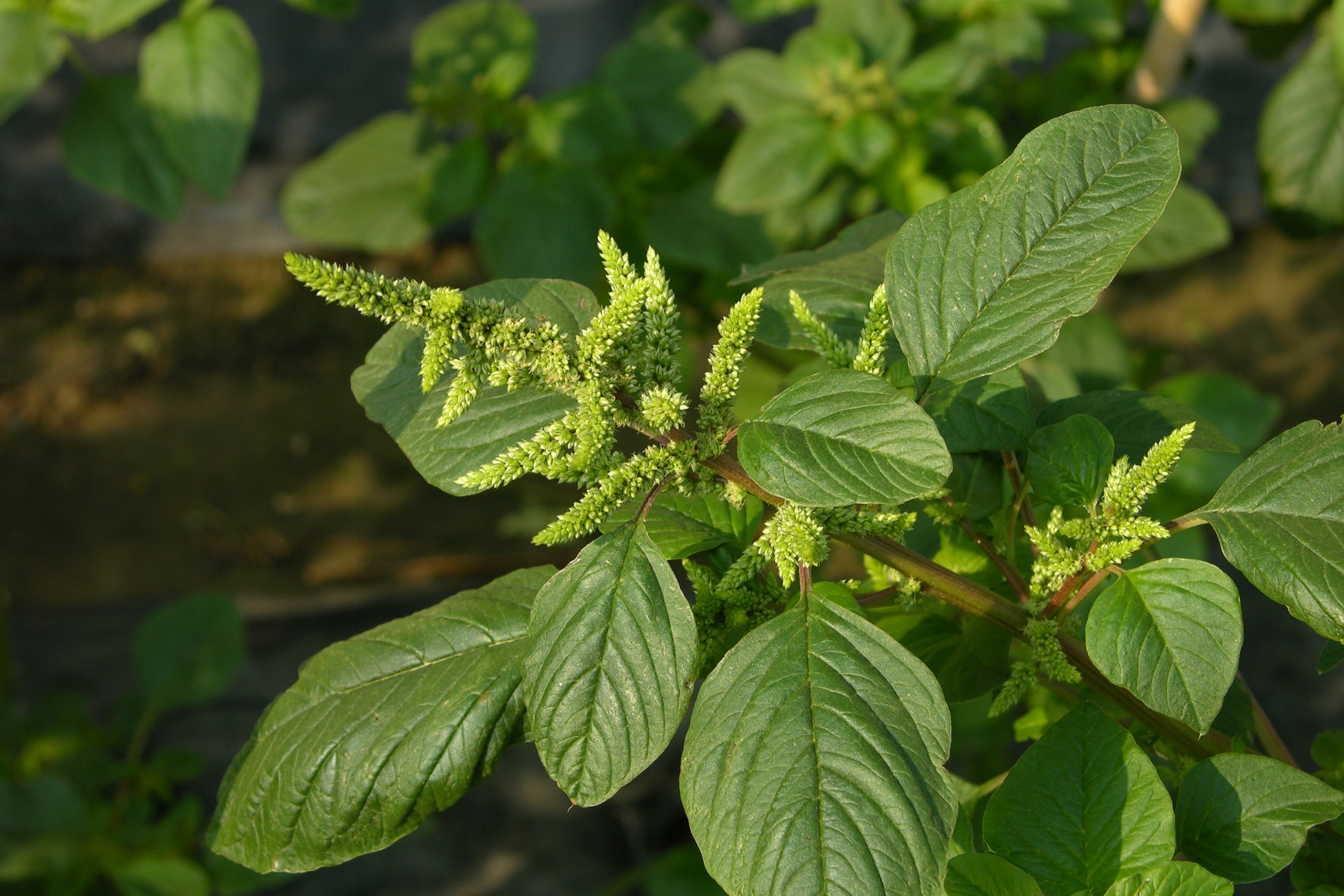
Amaranth (Amaranthus spp.), a traditional leafy green that also produces a nutritious grain

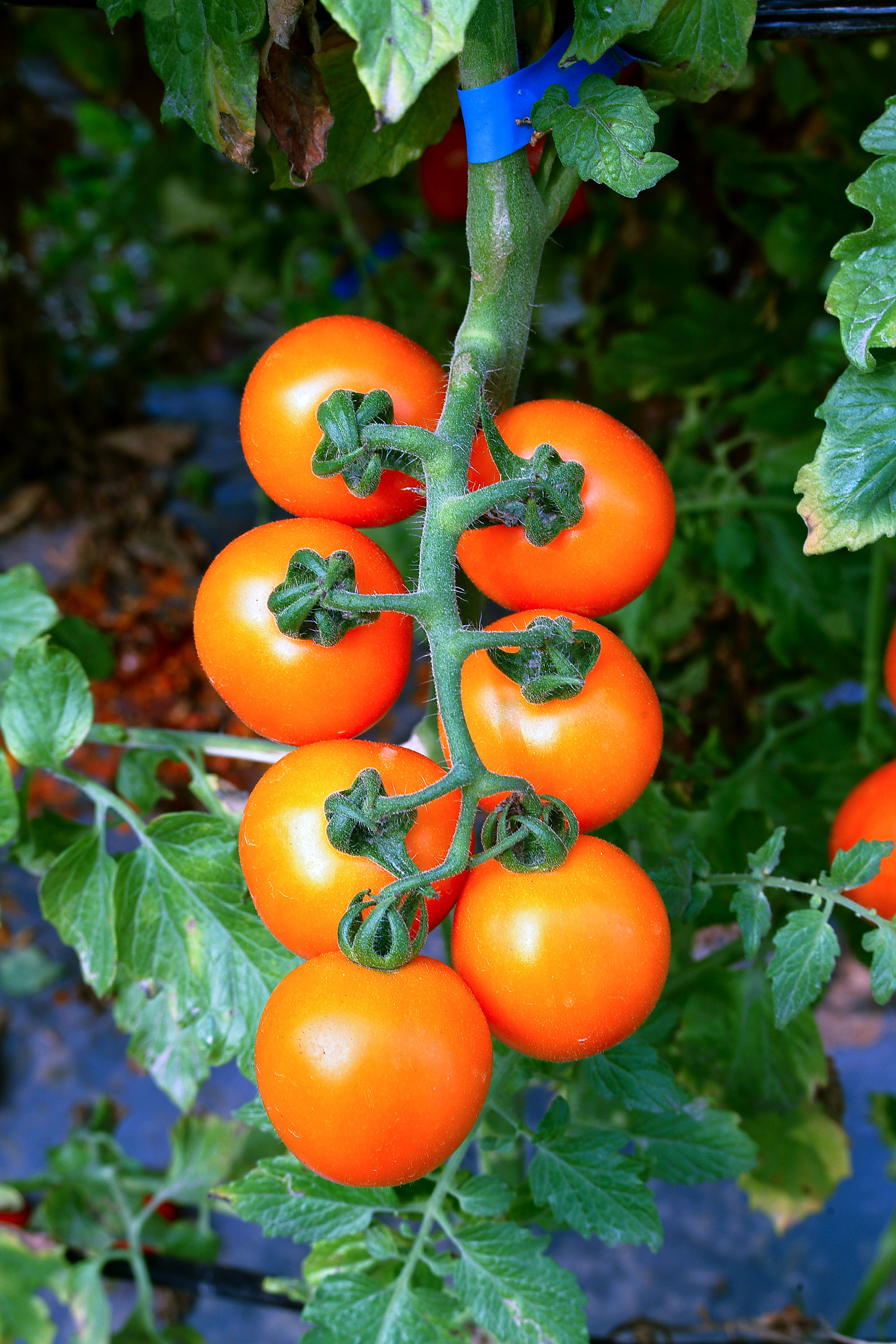
High beta-carotene cherry tomatoes bred by WorldVeg

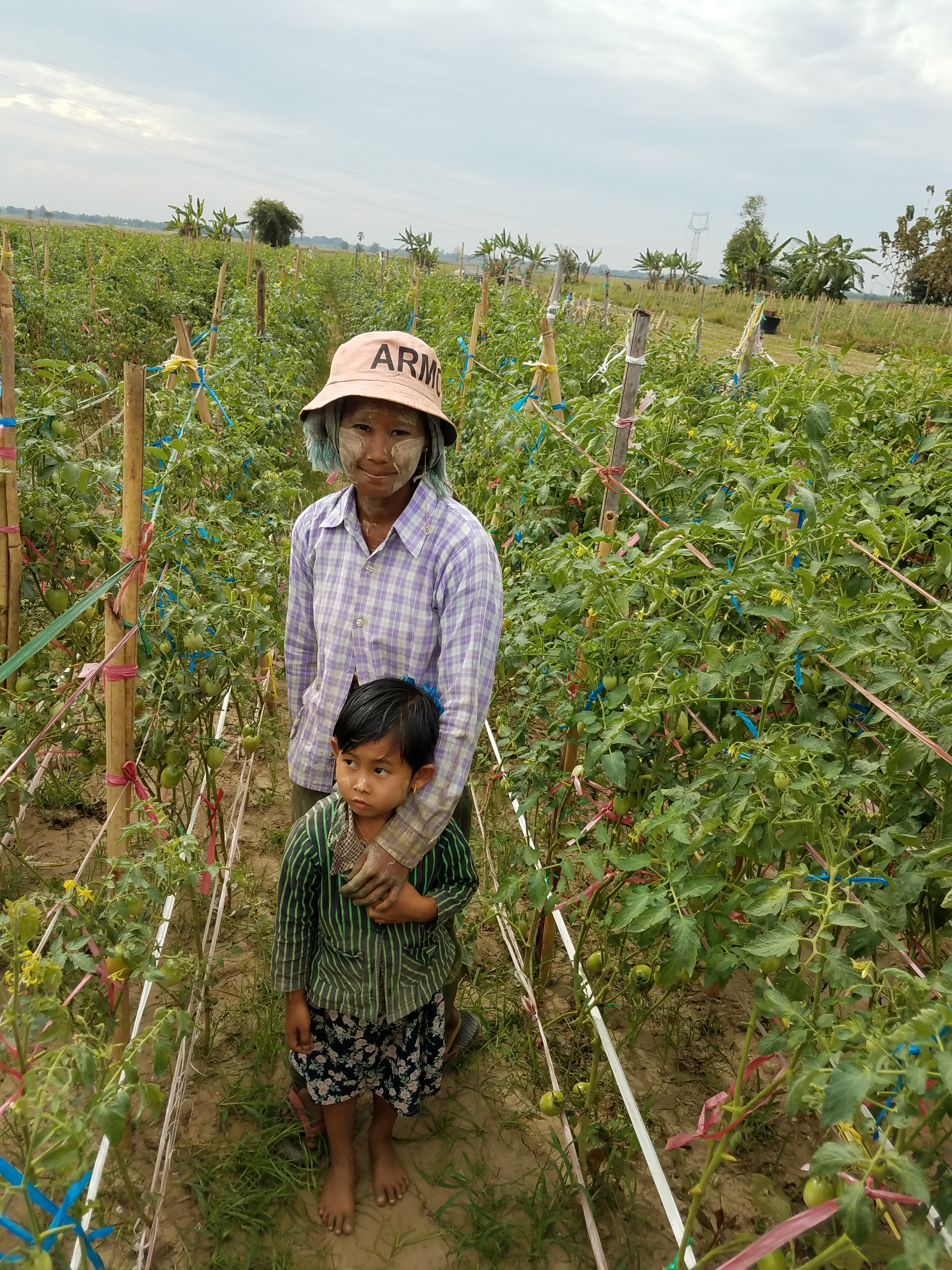
Tomato grower with child near NayPyiTaw, Myanmar

The use of vegetables as crops that are of high worth is important in the Sustainable Development Goals of the United Nations Development Program and the World Vegetable Center. The vegetables bred by the Center can be used in poorer areas, where they can serve as an important source of income and can help fight micronutrient deficiencies.

The Center's current crop portfolio focuses on several groups of globally important vegetables, according to the WorldVeg:

- solanaceous crops: (tomato, sweet pepper, chili pepper, eggplant)
- bulb alliums (onion, shallot, garlic)
- cucurbits (Cucurbitaceae): (cucumbers, pumpkins)

Indigenous or traditional vegetables, particularly those of Asia and Africa are another focus of research at the World Vegetable Center. Indigenous vegetables are domesticated or semi-wild vegetable crops that are grown in particular regions as an integral part of a local food system. Many of them are underutilized crops, particularly in regions where they are not native.

The Center has collaborated with the Global Crop Diversity Trust and Kew Gardens to study the domestication of eggplant.

The Center is believed to have the largest collection of chili peppers in the world. They have been engaged in research to find and breed climate change resistant chili pepper cultivars.

=== Climate change ===
According to the Public Broadcasting Service (PBS), "At the World Vegetable Center, experts are looking to the wild relatives of domesticated crops to save the human diet from climate change."

== Germplasm collection ==
A collection of vegetable germplasm is kept at the World Vegetable Center, which is considered to have the largest and most diverse collection in the world. The collection itself contains more than 60,000 accessions of 442 different species collected from 156 countries.

AVGRIS, the WorldVeg Vegetable Genetic Resources Information System, provides access to all the Center's data associated with germplasm conservation and management, from registration, characterization, evaluation, and seed inventory to seed distribution.

A backup selection of the Center's germplasm collection is held at the Svalbard Global Seed Vault in Norway with the goal of a backup for the entire collection being in place by 2025.

== See also ==
- Food and Agriculture Organization
- Chile Pepper Institute
