= Tea Research and Extension Station =

Tea research institute in Taiwan

- 行政院農業委員會茶業改良場

Agency overview
- Formed: 1903 (as Tea Manufacture Experiment Station); 2003 (as TRES)
- Jurisdiction: Taiwan (ROC)
- Headquarters: Yangmei, Taoyuan City, Taiwan
- Parent agency: Council of Agriculture
- Website: www.tres.gov.tw/en/index.php

The Tea Research and Extension Station (TRES; Chinese: 行政院農業委員會茶業改良場; pinyin: Xíngzhèngyuàn Nóngyè Wěiyuánhuì Cháyè Gǎiliáng Chǎng) is the research and development center of Taiwan tea where scientists and tea masters conduct study, research and experiment to improve tea plantations, to develop new and better cultivars, to manufacture and educate the industry and consumers in Taiwan. It is located on a 20-hectare (49-acre) site in Yangmei District, a region in which the slightly acidic soil not well suited for other agriculture has seen tea become a major crop. It is the only professional institution for the study and testing of tea in Taiwan, and is affiliated to the governmental Council of Agriculture.

== History ==
The center was originally established in 1903 as Tea Manufacture Experiment Station. In 1968, it was reorganized as Taiwan Tea Experiment Station. In 1999, it was reorganized again as Taiwan Tea Experiment Station. In 2003, it was renamed to Tea Research and Extension Station. The station has developed hybrid tea varieties such as Taiwan Tea No. 18 to boost Taiwanese black tea production.

== Organizational structures ==
=== Divisions ===
- Departments of Tea Agronomy
- Tea Manufacture
- Tea Machinery
- Tea Extension
- Tunding Branch

=== Offices ===
- Offices of Secretary
- Personnel Affairs
- Accounting

== See also ==
- Council of Agriculture (Taiwan)
- Taiwanese tea
- Tatung Institute of Commerce and Technology
- Pinglin Tea Industry Museum
- Taiwan Banana Research Institute
- Taiwan Sugar Research Institute
