= Jin Xuan tea =

Taiwanese oolong tea

Jin Xuan
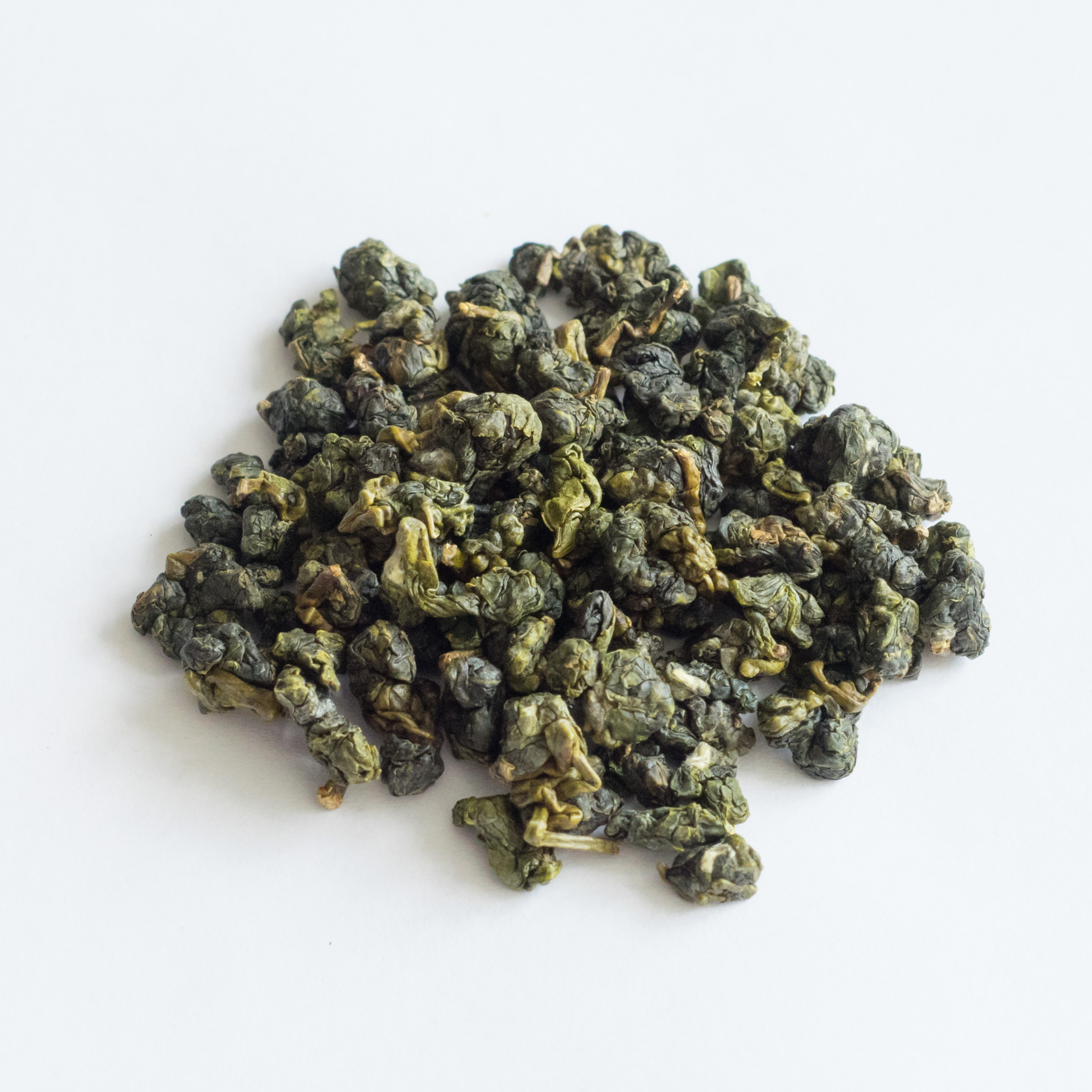
- Type: Oolong
- Other names: Jin Xuan, Milk Oolong, Nai Xiang, TTES #12
- Origin: Taiwan
- Quick description: Light highland oolong.
- Temperature: 85–95°C

Jin Xuan (Chinese: 金萱; pinyin: jīn xuān; lit. 'Golden Daylily'; pronounced [tɕín.ɕɥɛ́n]) is a variety of oolong tea developed in Taiwan in the early 1980s. Also referred to as #12 or "Milk Oolong" (Nai Xiang), it is known for its light, creamy, and floral flavor, often described as having a natural milky character. Jin Xuan tea is cultivated at higher altitudes and is popular among tea farmers in Taiwan and Thailand.

The characteristic buttery or milky taste of genuine Jin Xuan tea is a natural trait of the cultivar and not the result of external processing, such as steeping or steaming the leaves in milk. However, some producers create flavored Jin Xuan teas by adding artificial flavorings.. Reputable sellers typically indicate whether their Jin Xuan tea is naturally produced or flavored.

== See also ==
- Oolong
- Taiwanese tea
