= People's Park (Tianjin) =

Urban public park in Tianjin, China

- Renmin Park
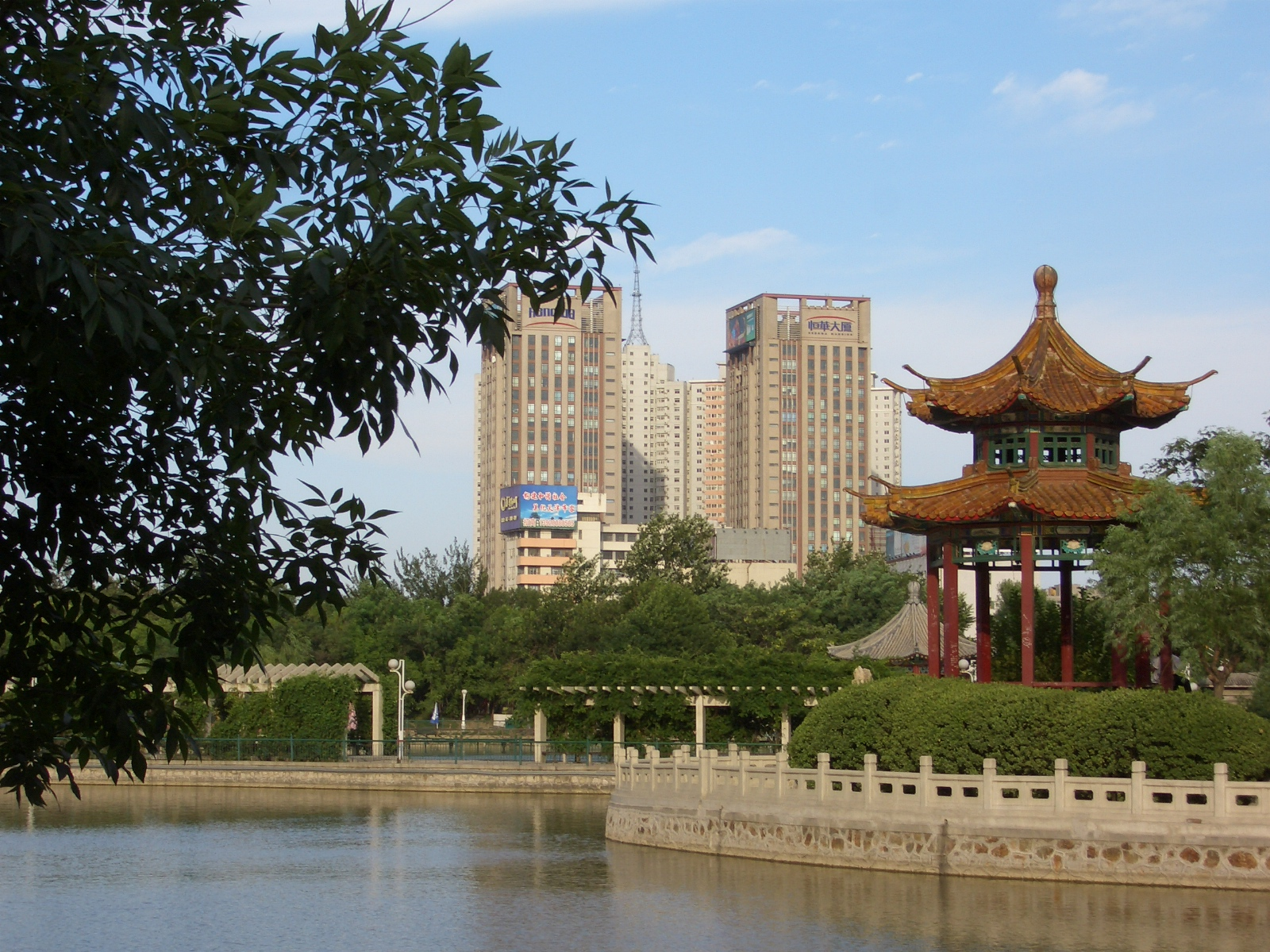
- Interactive map of People's Park
- Type: Urban park
- Location: Tianjin, China
- Coordinates: 39°6′23.5″N 117°13′9″E
- Area: 14.21 ha (35.1 acres)
- Created: 1863

People's Park (Chinese: 人民公园; pinyin: Rénmín Gōngyuán) is an urban public park and Qing-era Chinese garden in Hexi District in central Tianjin, China. Originally built in 1863 as the private Rong Garden (荣园), it was donated to the state and opened to the public in 1951.

== Geography ==
People's Park is in the northeast of Hexi District, bounded by Xiamen Road in the east, Guangdong Road in the west, Qiongzhou Road in the south, and Huizhou Road in the north. It covers an area of 14.21 hectares (35.1 acres), including 3.3 hectares (8.2 acres) of water.

== History ==
Built in 1863 during the Qing dynasty, the park was originally the private garden of the wealthy salt merchant Li Chuncheng (李春城). Its formal name was Rong Garden, but it was commonly called the Li Shanren (Philanthropist Li) Garden.

After the establishment of the People's Republic of China in 1949, the Li family donated the garden to the state, and it was opened to the public on 1 July 1951 as People's Park. In 1954, Chairman Mao Zedong presented the park with his calligraphy of its name. It is the only work of calligraphy Mao wrote for a park.

After major renovation work, the park was reopened in 2009. Entrance is free.
