= Pinshi Transfer Station =

Transfer station in East, Tainan, Taiwan

Pingshi Transfer Station

General information
- Location: East District, Tainan City, Taiwan
- Construction started: Approx. second half of 2021
- Completed: Not completed
- Cost: 2.002 billion New Taiwan Dollars

Technical details
- Structural system: Metro Station; Intercity Bus Terminal; Hotel; Shopping Center; Office building

Pingshi Transfer Station

General information
- Operated by: Tainan Metro
- Lines: █ Blue Line █ Green Line

Construction
- Architectural style: Elevated interchange station

Other information
- Station code: B14 (B5)／G17

Pingshi Transfer Station is a transportation hub located in East District, Tainan, Taiwan. It is a transfer station for the Green Line and Blue Line of the Tainan Metro under planning.

First phase of the station is expected be opened in 2026, with an intercity bus terminal, a shopping center and an office building.

== Mass transportation ==
=== Tainan Metro ===
- Tainan Metro Blue Line (under planning)
- Tainan Metro Green Line (under planning)

=== City bus ===
- Tainan Bus
  - 【2】 Kunshan University of Science and Technology－Anping
- Geya Bus
  - 【15】 Tainan Public Library－Chimei Medical Center－Dacheng Rd.& Simen Rd.
  - 【19】 The Indigenous Culture Museum－Dawan Senior High School
  - 【20】 Rende Bus Station－Annan Hospital
- Shingnan Bus
  - 【62】 Chimei Medical Center－HSR Tainan Station
  - 【G17】 Anping Industrial Park－Dawan－Xinhua Bus Station
  - 【O12】 Madou Bus Station－Shanhua Bus Station－Tainan Bus Station
  - 【R2】 Tainan Bus Station－Rende－Guanmiao Bus Station
- Hancheng Bus
  - 【111】 Siaosimen－Kaohsiung International Airport
  - 【O13】 Madou Bus Station－Tainan Bus Station

=== YouBike 2.0 ===
- Pingshi Park (21 lots)
