= Charles Y. Huang =

Taiwanese businessman

- 黃育徵
- Born: 1955 (age 70–71); Taoyuan, Taiwan
- Education: University of Pennsylvania (BS, MBA)
- Title: Chair of Taiwan Sugar Corporation (2016—2019)

Charles Y. Huang (Chinese: 黃育徵; pinyin: Huáng Yùzhēng; born 1955) is a Taiwanese businessman from Taoyuan, Taiwan. He was the chairperson and the CEO of TSRC Corp. He used to be a senior consultant to CTCI Group, a consultant of Booz Allen Hamilton, an analyst of Exxon International. He is the founder and now chairperson of Taiwan Circular Economy Network. He was the chairperson of the Taiwan Sugar Corporation (TSC) from 10 September 2016 to 19 June 2019. Starting from 7 February 2018, Huang has a column on circular economy published bi-weekly in the weekly magazine Business Today (今周刊) to promote circular economy in Taiwan.

== Education ==
Huang was educated in the United States. He graduated from the University of Pennsylvania with a Bachelor of Science (B.S.) in chemistry in 1977, then earned his Master of Business Administration (M.B.A.) from the university's Wharton School in 1979.

== As chairperson of Taiwan Sugar Corporation ==
On 10 September 2016, Huang was appointed as the chairperson of Taiwan Sugar Corporation. As soon as he received the position, he started to promote the establishment of the first modernized Don-Hai-Feng Pig Farm in Pingtung County with biogas facility producing green energy by using the pig wastes co-digested with agricultural wastes as well as making the water recycle-used as a circular resource, with the goals of zero waste, zero pollution, and zero accident. The ground-breaking of this project is on 8 February 2018. The pig farm was installed with the cooling pads with negative pressure. Huang was replaced by Chen Chao-yi as chairperson of TSC in June 2019.

== Other activities ==
While Huang was the executive board director of the Federal Transportation, he was elected as the chairperson of the World Youth and Student Travel Conference (WYSTC) in 2008, a trade event for the global youth, student and educational travel industry conducted by the WYSE Travel Confederation and the organisations which merged to form WYSE.

== Works ==
- Charles Huang (2017-01-19). 循環經濟 [Circular Economy]. CommonWealth Magazine Group. ISBN 9789863982296.
