= Tainan Mosque =

Mosque in East, Tainan, Taiwan

- 台南清真寺
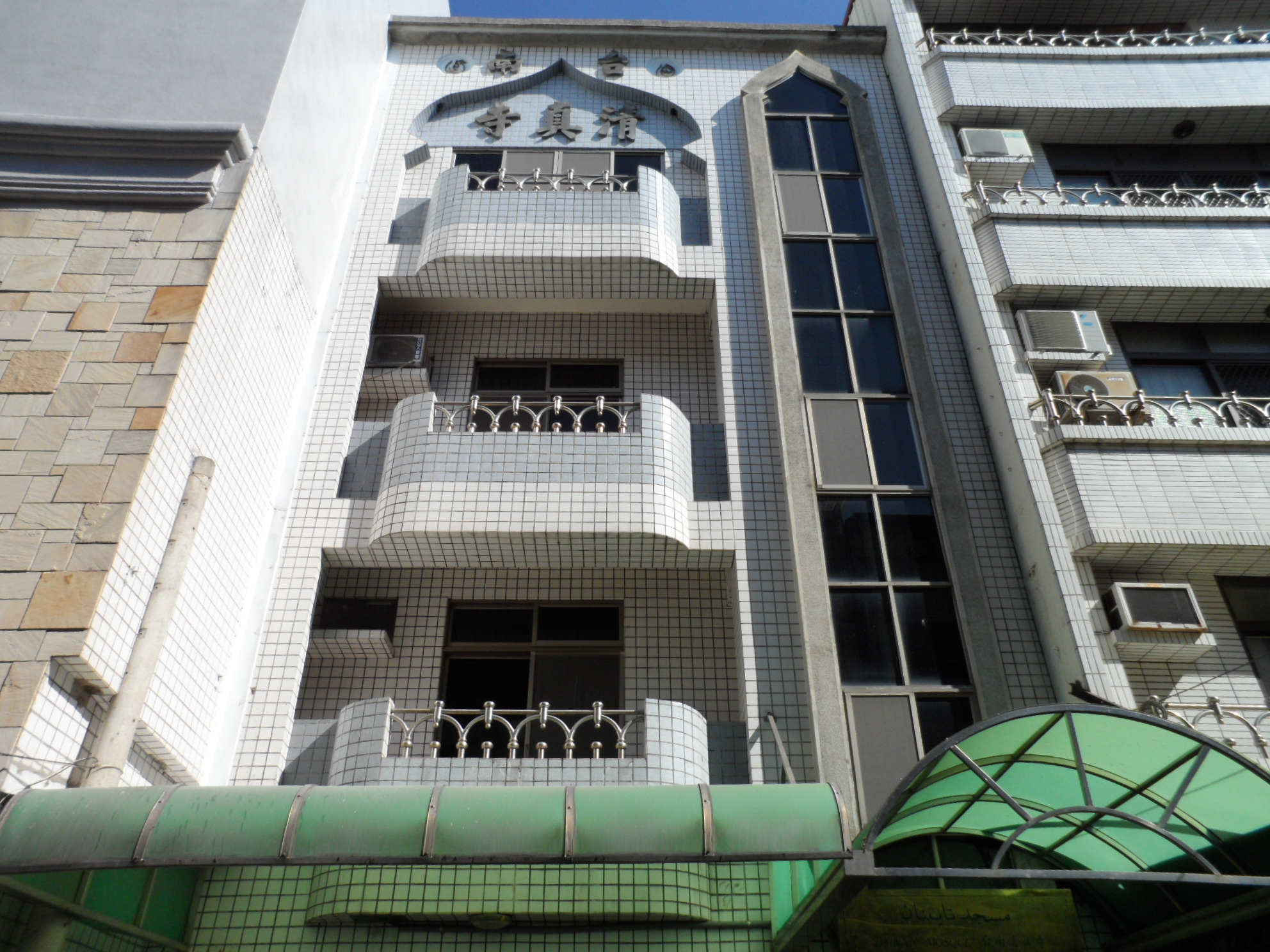

- Location of the mosque in Tainan

Religion
- Affiliation: Sunni Islam
- Ecclesiastical or organizational status: Mosque
- Status: Active

Location
- Location: 12, Lane 34, Alley 77, Section 3, Chunghwa East Road, East District, Tainan
- Country: Taiwan
- Interactive map of Tainan Mosque
- Coordinates: 22°58′42″N 120°13′42″E

Architecture
- Architect: Yan Mingguang
- Type: Mosque
- Groundbreaking: 1993
- Completed: 1996

Chinese name
- Traditional Chinese: 台南清真寺
Transcriptions
Standard Mandarin
- Hanyu Pinyin: Táinán Qīngzhēnsì

The Tainan Mosque (Chinese: 台南清真寺; pinyin: Táinán Qīngzhēnsì) is a mosque in the East District of Tainan, Taiwan.

== History ==
Before the establishment of the mosque, Muslims around Tainan travelled to the Kaohsiung Mosque for worship. Wang Huihuan, a former local Muslim living in the United States, donated land to the Taipei Grand Mosque, but then it was transferred to the Kaohsiung Mosque congregation, which managed the construction of the mosque at Tainan.

Fundraising for the mosque began in 1983, led by Bai Yuqi, Chairman of the Kaohsiung Mosque. Auspiced by the Kaohsiung Mosque, funds were raised over ten years. The construction of the mosque commenced in 1993 and was completed in September 1996.

Due to the closed relationship between the two mosques, the imam of the Tainan Mosque is often the vice-imam of the Kaohsiung Mosque.

== Architecture ==
The Tainan Mosque was designed by Yan Mingguang, a National Cheng Kung University graduate from Jordan. The mosque looks like an ordinary apartment building, completely unlike a traditional mosque. The building consists of four floors that contain a shop, a meeting room, wudu areas for men and women, a prayer hall and an office.

== Transportation ==
The mosque is accessible south-east of Tainan Station of Taiwan Railway.

== See also ==
- Islam in Taiwan
- List of mosques in Taiwan
