= Taiwanese tea =

Teas from Taiwan

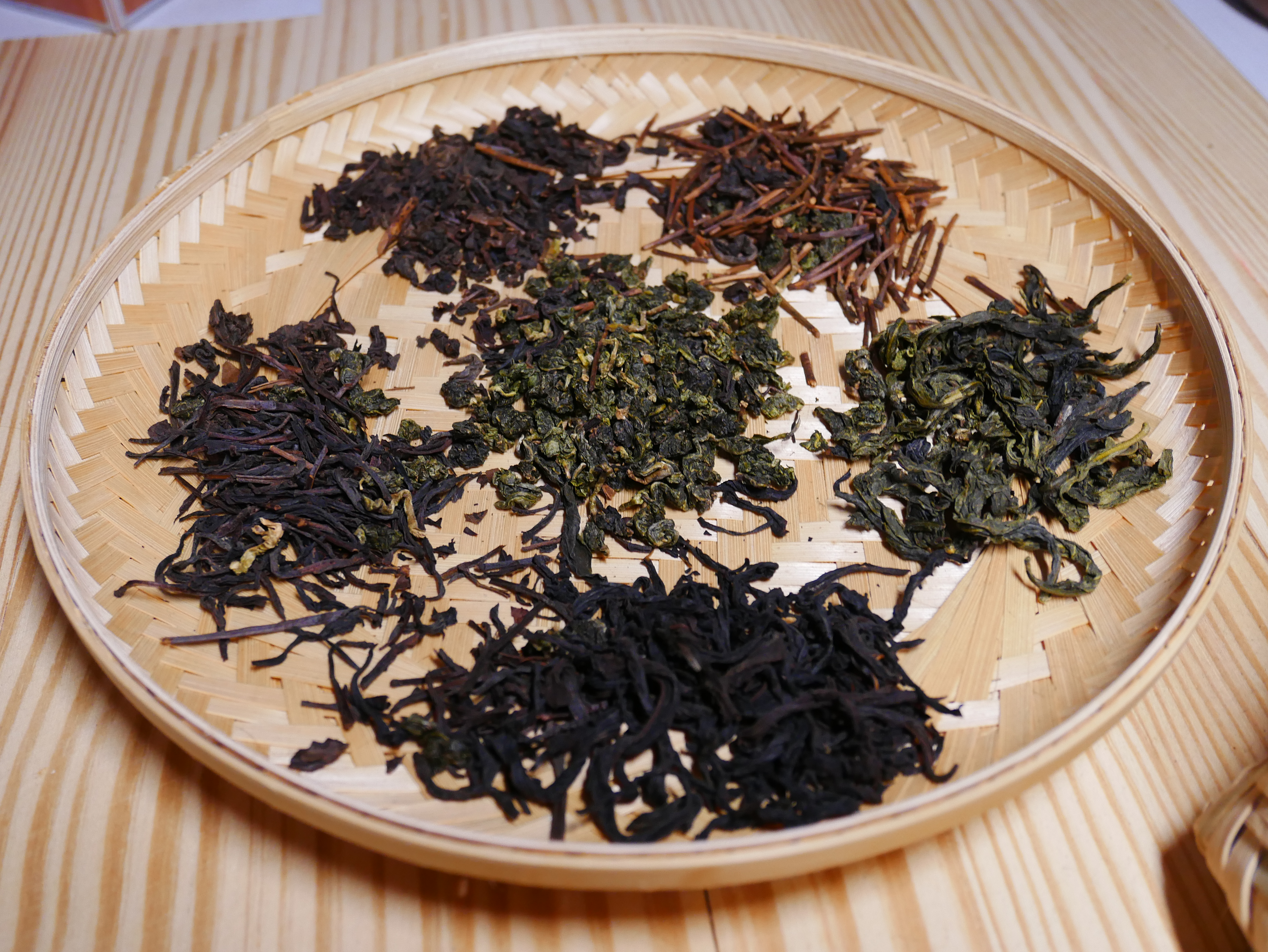
Assorted Taiwanese teas

Taiwanese tea includes four main types: oolong tea, black tea, green tea and white tea. The earliest record of tea trees found in Taiwan is from 1717 in Shui Sha Lian (水沙連), present-day Yuchi and Puli, Nantou County. Some of the teas retain the island country's former name, Formosa.

Oolongs grown in Taiwan account for about 20% of world production.

== History ==
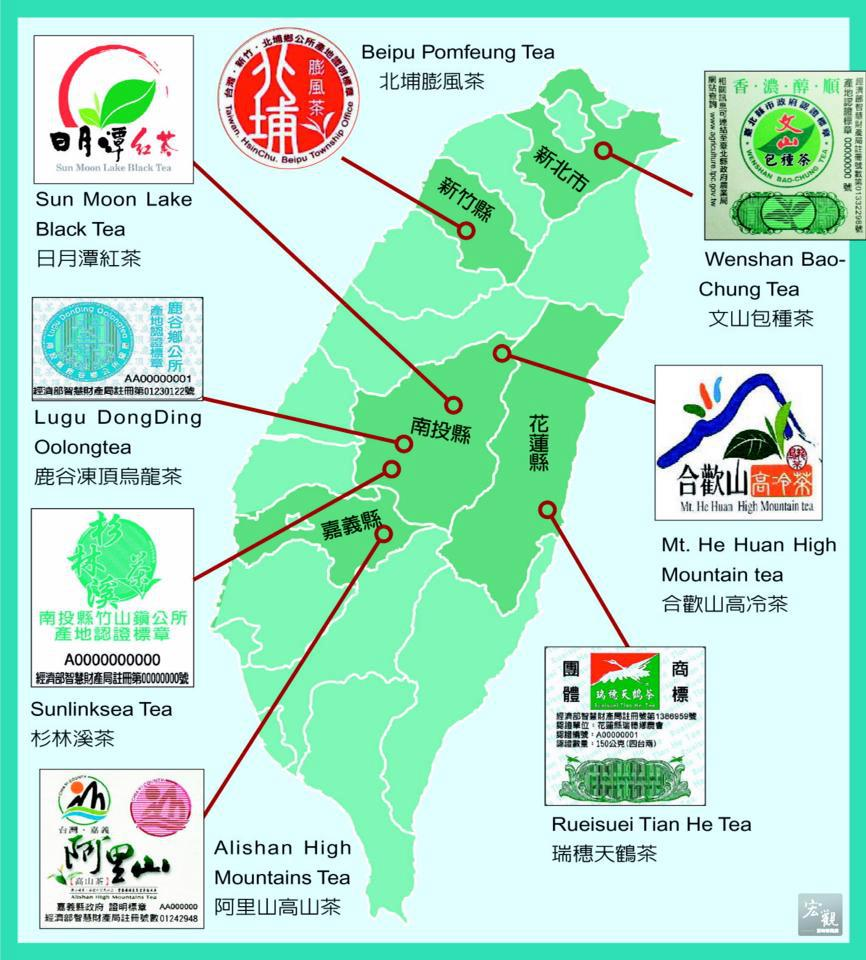
Taiwan tea government certification mark

According to Lian Heng's General History of Taiwan, in the late 18th century, Ke Chao (柯朝) brought some tea trees from Fujian into Taiwan and planted them in Jieyukeng (櫛魚坑), in the area of modern-day Ruifang District, New Taipei City. However, transaction records indicate that tea business in Muzha area started as early as late 18th century. These records indicate that tea has been sold in Taiwan for more than two centuries.

In 1855, Lin Fengchi (林鳳池) brought the Qingxin oolong (青心烏龍) plants from the Wuyi Mountains of Fujian to Taiwan and planted them in Dongding Village (Lugu, Nantou County). This is said to be the origin of Tung-ting tea.

After the Treaty of Tientsin was ratified in 1860 and the port of Tamsui was opened for trade, Scottish entrepreneur John Dodd began working with tea merchants and farmers to promote Taiwanese tea, slowly developing it as an export item. Before long, tea ranked first among Taiwan's top three exports, ahead of sugar and camphor. The earliest teas exported during the Qing dynasty were oolong and baozhong tea, which began to be sold abroad in 1865 and 1881, respectively.

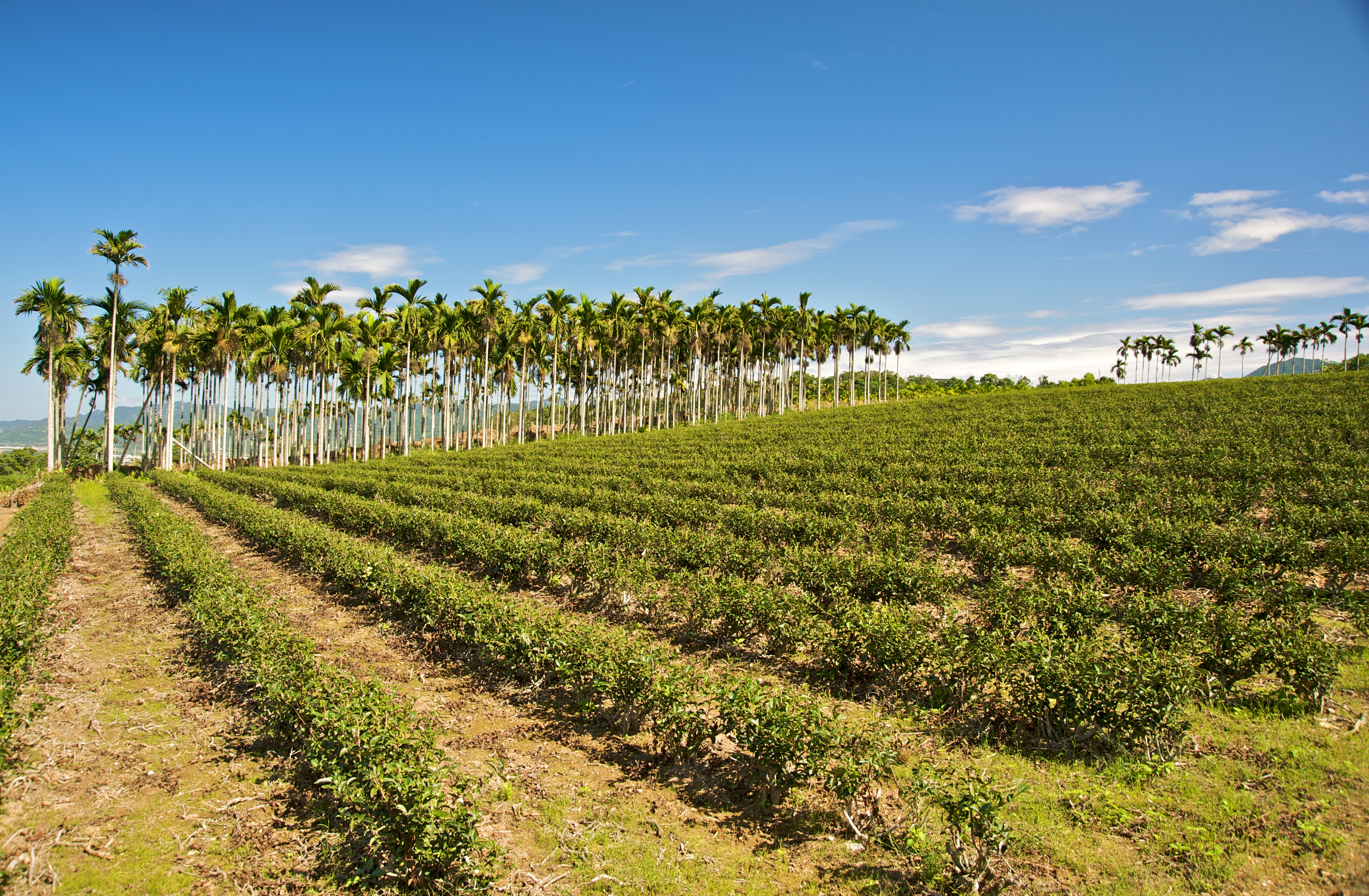
A tea garden in Ruisui, Hualien

In 1867, Dodd started a tea company in Wanhua, Taipei, and started to sell Taiwanese oolong tea to the world under the name "Formosa Oolong". Aware of British plans to develop a tea industry in India, he successfully sought profit in developing an alternative tea product on the island. Pouchong oolong was considered to be more flowery than Baihao oolong. Pouchong was exported under the name "Formosa Pouching". Other types of Taiwanese Oolongs include Dongding oolong (凍頂烏龍茶), white tip oolong (白毫烏龍茶), and baochong oolong (包種烏龍茶). Oolong tea was practically synonymous with Taiwanese tea in the late 19th century, and competitors in Ceylon sought a US market advantage by publishing materials emphasizing the use of human foot trampling during its production. This was countered by the mechanization of tea processing, publicized at the St. Louis Exhibition.

After acquiring Taiwan the Japanese set out to turn their new colonial possession into “another Darjeeling.” Formal efforts began in 1906 with early production exported to Turkey and Russia. The Mitsui Corporation led development of the industry in the north however they found the region to be unsuitable for the major tea varieties from Assam and Sri Lanka. In the 1920s plantations of Indian tea varieties were developed in Yuchi Township, Nantou County. In 1926 the Yuchi Black Tea Research Institute was founded. The Research Institute focused on hybridizing commercial tea varieties with Taiwan's indigenous varieties. The development of the industry continued through World War II. After the war Yuchi Black Tea Research Institute head Kokichiro Arai staying on under the Kuomintang regime. The industry continued to expand until the 1960s before declining. After the 1999 Jiji earthquake the government paid heavily to rebuild the industry.

China was subject to trade embargos during the 1950s and 1960s, and during this time Taiwanese tea growers and marketers focused on existing, well-known varieties. After the mainland's products became more widely available and the market for teas became more competitive, the Taiwanese tea industry changed its emphasis to producing special varieties of tea, especially of Oolong. The Government Tea Inspection Office grades teas into 18 categories ranging from standard to choice.

The government-supported Tea Research and Extension Station (TRES), established to promote Taiwanese tea in 1903, conducts research and experimentation.

== Production and cultivars ==
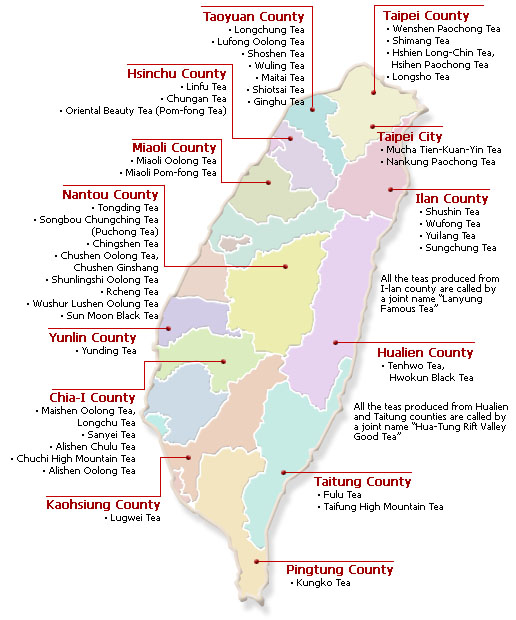
The main tea areas of Taiwan

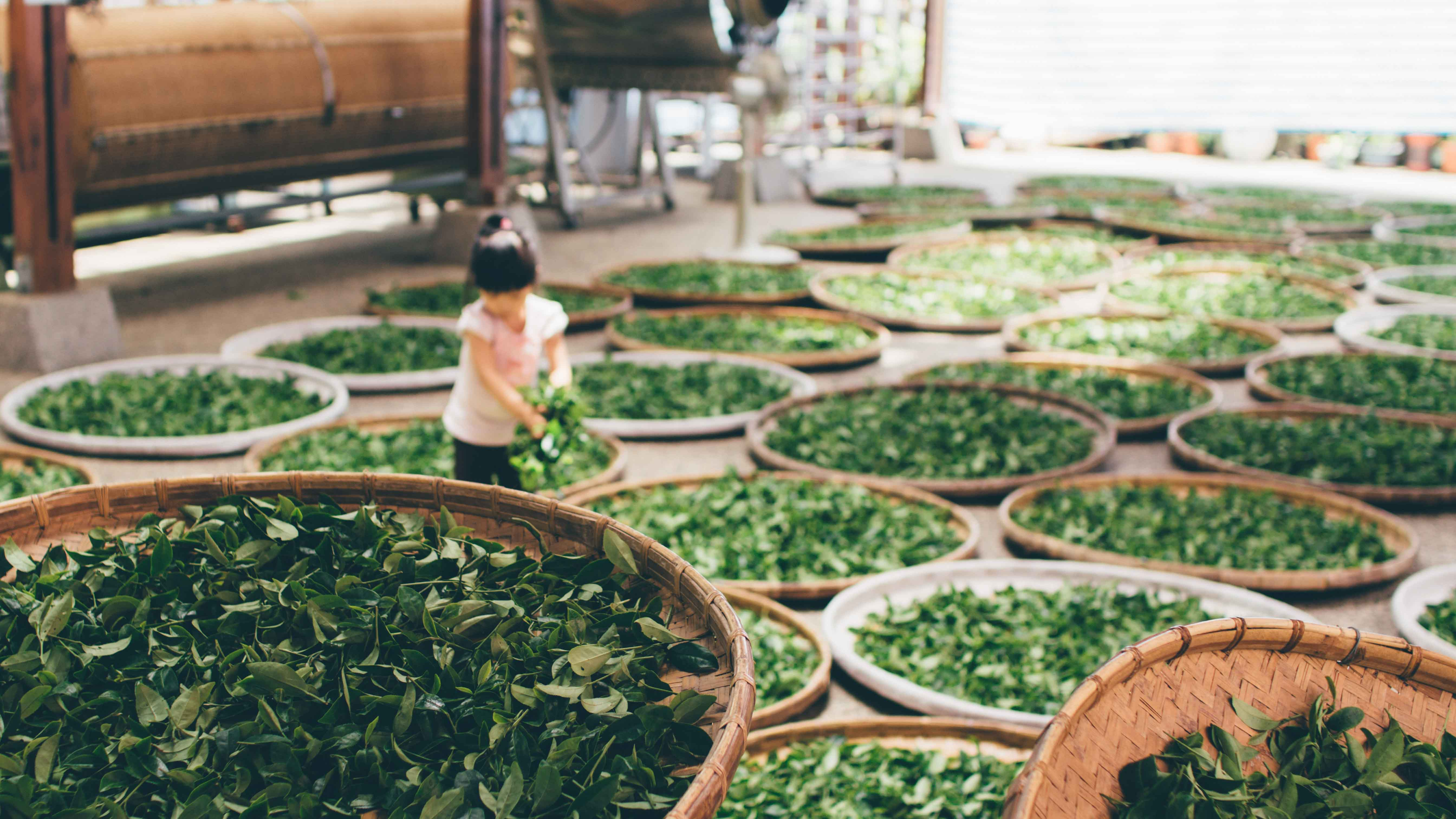
Tea processing in Taiwan

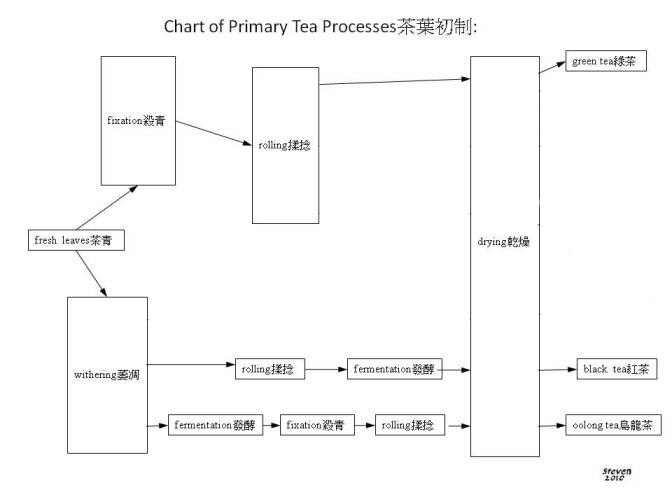
Primary Tea Processing (no roasting, scenting, or spicing)

The major tea growing areas in Taiwan are:

- Northern Taiwan: Includes Hsindian, Pinglin, Muzha, Shenkeng, Shidian, Sanhsia, Nangang, and Yilan.
- Mid-central Area: Includes Miaoli and Hsinchu.
- Eastern Taiwan: Includes Taitung and Hualien.
- South-central Taiwan: Includes Nantou, Pingtung, Chiayi, Taichung, and Yunlin.
- High Mountain Regions: Includes Alishan, Yu Shan, Hsueh Shan, and Taitung mountain ranges.

The major tea cultivars and varietals in Taiwan are:

- Qingxin 青心 (also known as high mountain, ruanzhi) – This is the most common cultivar (about 60%) in Taiwan and derives from the tea brought over by Fujianese settlers in the 1700s and 1800s. It is mainly made into oolongs.
- Jinxuan 金萱 (also known as #12, #27, "milk oolong") – A new cultivar developed by TRES through selective breeding. It is easier to grow and yields more tea per acre, but it is not well suited to high mountain cultivation. It is mainly made into oolongs.
- Sijicun 四季春 (4 season) – A varietal developed through crossbreeding by farmers in the Taipei area. It is cheaper to produce due to high year-round yields.
- Cuiyi 翠玉 (also known as #13, Jade oolong)
- Hongyu 紅玉 (also known as Red ruby, #18, Sun Moon Lake) – This variety is mainly processed into Sun Moon Lake black tea.
- Taiwanese Indigenous Mountain Tea 台灣原山茶 (also known as formosensis, mountain tea, shancha) – This is an indigenous wild varietal from Taiwan. It is made into oolongs, white teas and black teas.
- Ganzai 柑仔 – Mainly used to make Green tea like biluochun and longjing.
- Tieguanyin (正欉)鐵觀音 – Derives from tea brought to Taiwan from Southern Fujian settlers.

== Oolong teas ==
Taiwan's climate, along with the development of tea technology, has contributed to the production of high-quality teas.

Taiwan is particularly known for its oolongs (Chinese: 烏龍; pinyin: wūlóng; lit. 'dark dragon'). According to the 1997 version of the Joy of Cooking, Taiwanese oolongs are considered to be some of the finest by tea connoisseurs. The best known ones include "Dongding", "Milk oolong" (Jinxuan), "Tie Guanyin" (Iron Goddess), "High Mountain" (i.e. Qingxiang) oolongs like "Alishan", and "Wenshan", "Oriental beauty", "Baozhong", "Shanlinxi", and "Jade oolong". The US cooks Julee Rosso and Sheila Lukins describe three Taiwanese oolongs as the "Champagne of tea". Their special quality may be due to unique growing conditions.

Oolong is harvested five times per year in Taiwan, between April and December. The July and August crops generally receive the highest grades.

=== High Mountain (Gaoshan) oolongs ===
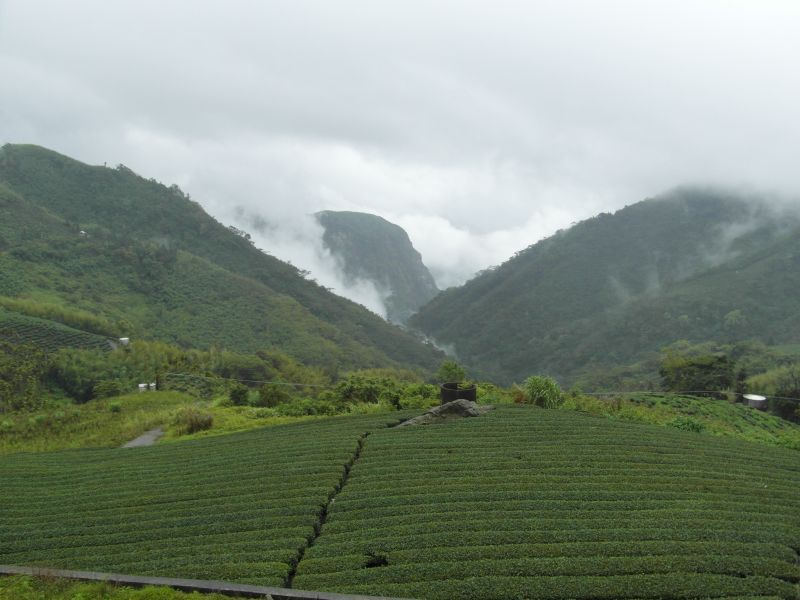
Tea plantation in Alishan

Gaoshan, is a tea generally grown at altitudes of 1,000 meters or above. These oolongs may be processed with low oxidation and low roast (Qingxiang oolong), low oxidation and medium roast (Beixiang oolong) or heavy roast (Shouxiang oolong). High mountain oolongs are currently the most popular oolongs in Taiwan.

The most commonly named mountain regions which produce high mountain oolongs are: Alishan 阿里山, Lishan 梨山, Huagang 華崗, Dayuling 大禹嶺, Fushoushan 福壽山, Hehuanshan 合歡山, Yushan 玉山, Qilaishan 奇萊山, Shanlinxi 杉林溪.

Alishan (阿里山)

This is the most widely known general name for lightly oxidized oolong tea, much of it picked in winter and therefore termed “winter tea”. Among the oolongs grown on Ali Mountain, tea merchants tend to stress the special qualities of the gold lily (Chinese: 金萱; pinyin: Jīn Xuān; Wade–Giles: Chin-Hsuan) tea variety, which is the name of a cultivar developed in Taiwan in the 1980s. The oolong tea made with this cultivar has a particular milky flavor. However, in some regions, such as where Alishan zhulu tea is grown, the most prized are the ones made with the Qing Xin cultivar. Tea made with this cultivar has a floral and ripe-fruity aroma.

Lishan (梨山)

Grown at altitudes above 2,200 meters, was the costliest Taiwanese tea during the 2000s, sometimes commanding prices of over US$200 per 600 grams.

Dayuling (大禹嶺)

Grown at altitudes above 2,500 meters. Due to the limited production of this tea, the price per 500 grams is usually around $200 to US$500. Because of its popularity, there are unscrupulous businessmen selling fake/unqualified tea using Dayuling's brand name.

=== Dongding ===
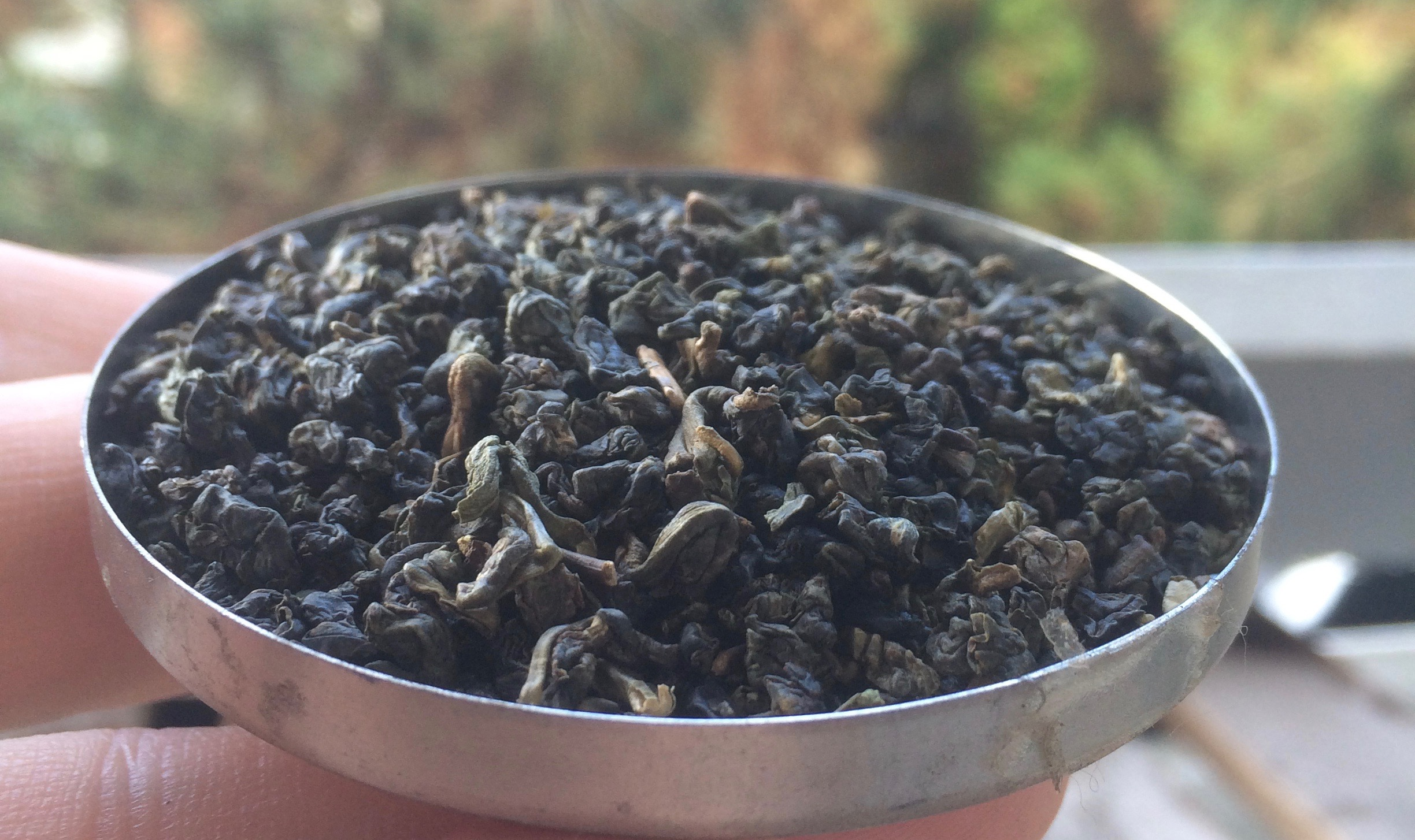
Dong Ding tea

This tea, grown on Dongding (凍頂, Icy Peak) mountain in Nantou County, was brought to Taiwan during the 19th century from China’s Wuyi Mountains. Its special qualities have been attributed to an almost continuous fog. Teas harvested in the spring are entered in a competition and the winners go for premium prices, fetching US$2,000 for a 600-gram package during the 1990s. Dongding oolong undergoes less oxidization than most oolongs. A 40-minute roasting over charcoal contributes to its flavor, which also has "nutty, caramel, and chestnut" elements.

Tongding Oolong tea is a semi-oxidized tea with a hemispherical shape, created through a baking process. The tea leaves are rolled into round balls through multiple kneading and undergo post-oxidization, resulting in a more pronounced flavor profile for Oolong tea.

Aged dongding tea is also a popular form of this tea.

=== Milk oolong ===
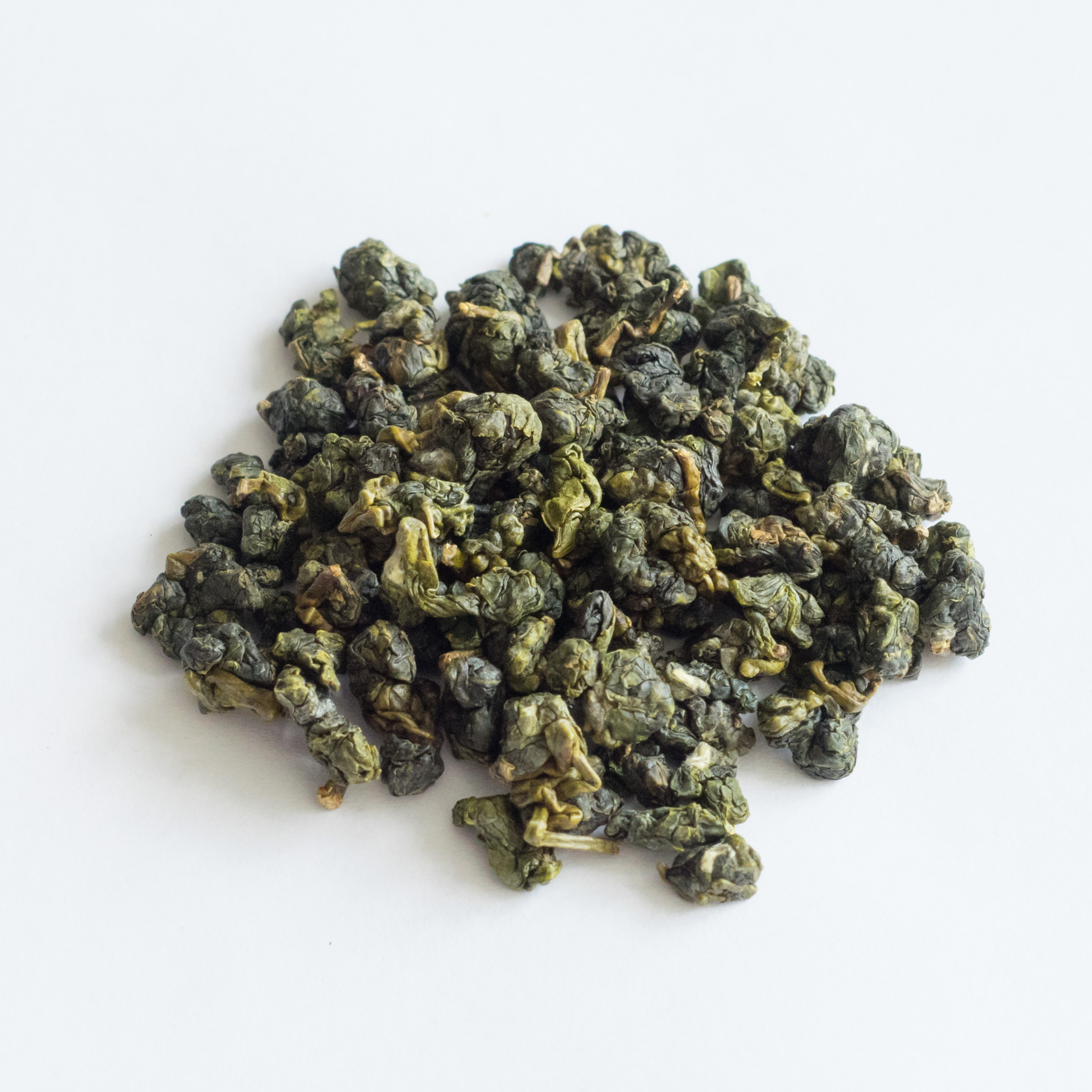
Jin Xuan (Golden Lily) oolong tea, grown on Alishan, Taiwan.

Oolongs made from the Jinxuan cultivar are generically called milk oolongs or just Jinxuan oolongs (金萱; pinyin: jīn xuān; lit. 'Golden Daylily'). They so called because they have a smooth and slight milky in taste and texture, with fruit, floral or cream notes.

Some sellers might claim the teas were steamed or steeped in milk, but the milky aroma of this tea is natural. However, some producers might artificially add milky scents or flavorings to enhance the milk flavor of the tea, though this is generally frowned upon by enthusiasts.

=== Pouchong (or Baozhong) ===
Pouchong oolong, also called light oolong, is a lightly oxidized tea, twist shape, with floral notes, and usually not roasted, somewhere between green tea and what is usually considered oolong tea, though often classified with the latter due to its lack of the sharper green tea flavours. Pouchong refers to its paper wrapping.

=== Bug bitten oolongs ===
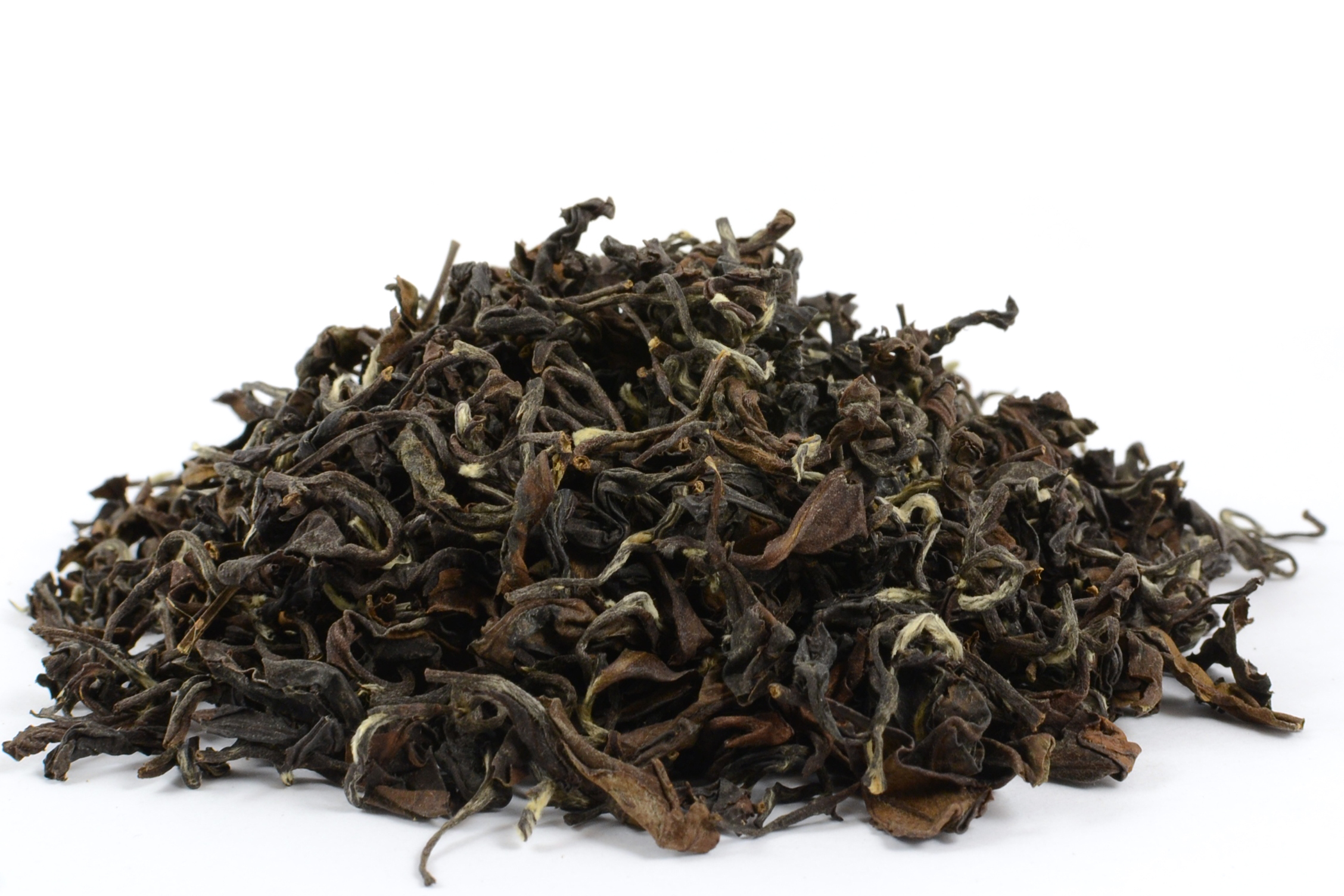
Dongfang Meiren dry leaf

White tip oolong is very fruity in taste and got the name "Oriental Beauty" (Dongfang Meiren) , thus "Formosa oolong" became popular in the western world for "oriental beauty" (東方美人茶). Along with Lishan oolong, it was one of the most costly exported Taiwanese teas during the 2000s. Its unique sweet flavor originates from the fact that insects have bitten the leaves of the tea plant, which causes the plant to produce different compounds in self-defense. Hence this tea has also been called a "bug bitten" oolong. The acceptance of this flavor has led to tolerance of the presence of insects and organic growing practices for this tea.

Another bug bitten oolong is Guifei (honey concubine, honey oolong). This oolong is usually more heavily roasted than oriental beauty.

=== Iron Goddess (Tie Guanyin) ===
This variety originated in China and is associated with a legend in which a tea grower found a unique tea plant near an iron statue of Guanyin (the compassionate "hearer of sounds" bodhisattva in East Asian Buddhism).

Taiwanese Muzha Tieguanyin (木柵鐵觀音) is processed in the traditional method. This means it is roasted longer than the lighter and greener Tieguanyin from Anxi province (which is more popular in the mainland). As such, Taiwanese Tieguanyin has a stronger taste and a roast nutty character with a reddish brown liquid.

=== Red oolong ===
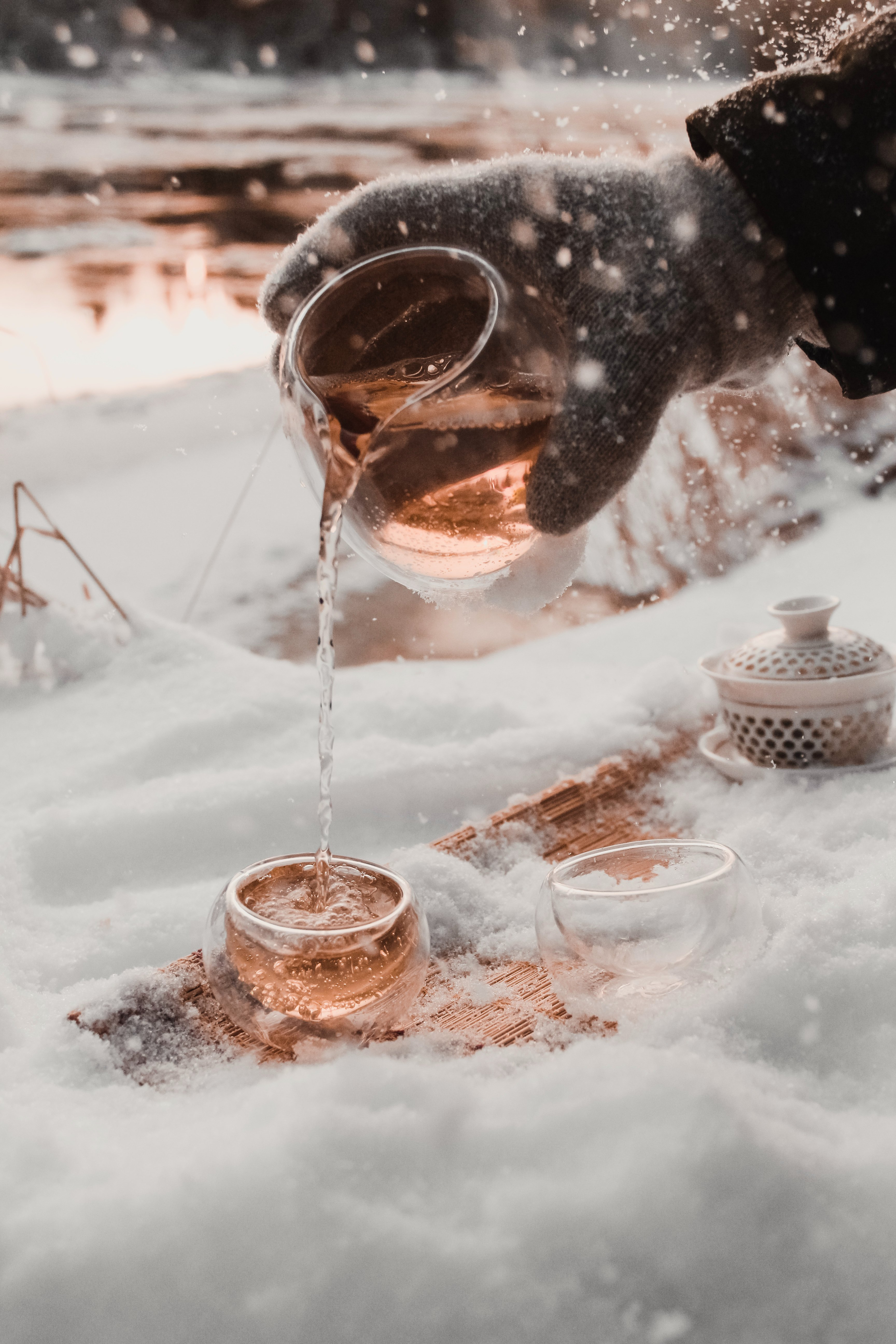
Brewing a red oolong

Red oolong (紅烏龍) or Gui Fei Oolong is a new style which is rolled and crushed before fixing, making it much more heavily oxidized. It is tightly rolled into balls. It produces a light reddish liquor when brewed.

=== Scented oolongs ===
Taiwan also produces scented teas, including osmanthus oolong scented with osmanthus flowers. The tea is also packaged with some flowers added after the scenting process. This tea is roasted, with floral and warming notes.

Jasmine scented oolongs are also made in Taiwan, along with Orange blossom oolong and Pomelo blossom oolong.

== Black tea ==
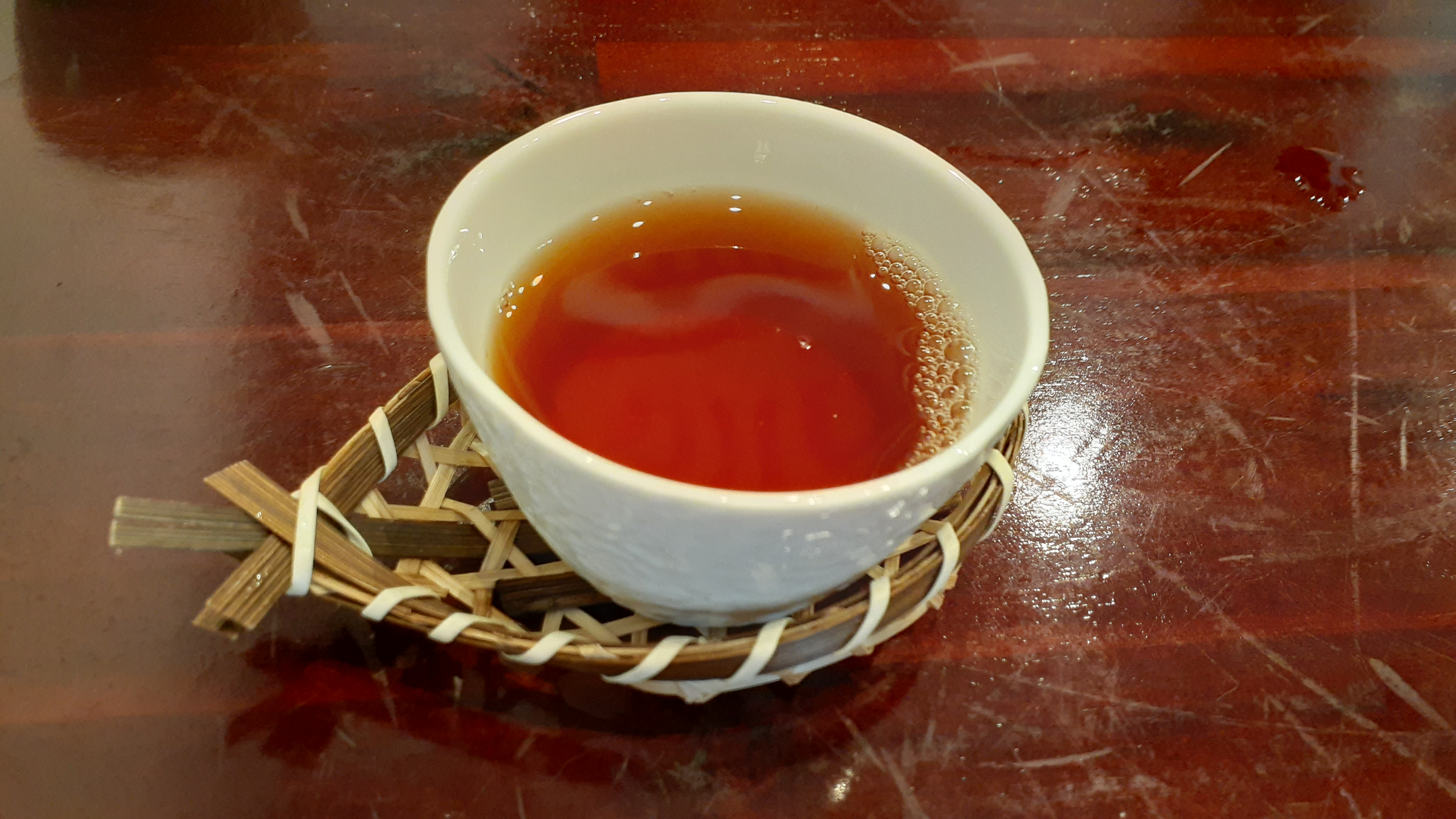
A Taiwanese black tea

=== Black Jade Taiwan Tea ===
TTES #18 is a cultivar developed by the Taiwan Tea Research and Experiment Station during the 1990s. The now popular tea is a hybrid of Camellia sinensis v. assamica and a native variety (Camellia sinensis forma formosensis), and is said to have notes of honey, cinnamon, and mint. The tea's natural sweetness is a result of the fostered relationship with insects. The native Leafhopper (Jacobiasca formosana) spends its time throughout the growing season laying eggs and biting the tea plant, which causes the plant to produce two compounds, monoterpene diol and hotrienol. This defense mechanism, in addition to Leafhopper eggs, results in this Taiwanese Black tea's unique flavor.

=== Sun Moon Lake Black Tea ===
Grown in the Sun Moon Lake region of Nantou County, this tea is famous for its unique flavor character, which reveals hints of cinnamon and mint. Although it is a relatively new representative of Taiwanese tea, it has quickly gained popularity.

== Green tea ==
Taiwanese Green tea, in styles such as Dragon Well (Longjing tea) and Green Snail Spring (Biluochun), are grown in Sanxia District, New Taipei City.

== White tea ==
White teas are produced in Taiwan, though in lesser quantities than others. They include: Hongyu white tea, Wuyi white tea, and Taiwan indigenous white tea (made from the indigenous mountain tea cultivar).

== Bubble tea ==
Bubble tea originated in Taiwan during the 1980s and is now popular worldwide.

== See also ==
- Taiwanese tea culture
- Tea Research and Extension Station Taiwan TRES
- Fo Shou tea
- Coffee in Taiwan
