= Taiwan Sugar Corporation =

State-owned company in Taiwan

Taiwan Sugar Corporation 台灣糖業股份有限公司
- Formerly: 臺灣糖業有限公司
- Company type: Joint-stock company, Government-owned corporation of Ministry of Economic Affairs; formerly: Limited liability company
- Traded as: (1237.TW)
- Industry: Agriculture
- Founded: 1946; Shanghai City
- Headquarters: No. 68 Shengchan Rd., East, Tainan, Taiwan
- Area served: Taiwan
- Key people: Chairman: Yang Ming-jou; President: Chen Li-jen
- Net income: NTD 56,367,498,650
- Divisions: Marketing Business Division; Hypermarket Business Division; Animal Industry Business Division; Petroleum Business Division; Sugar Business Division; Biotechnology Business Division; Agriculture Business Division; Leisure Business Division
- Website: Taisugar.com.tw

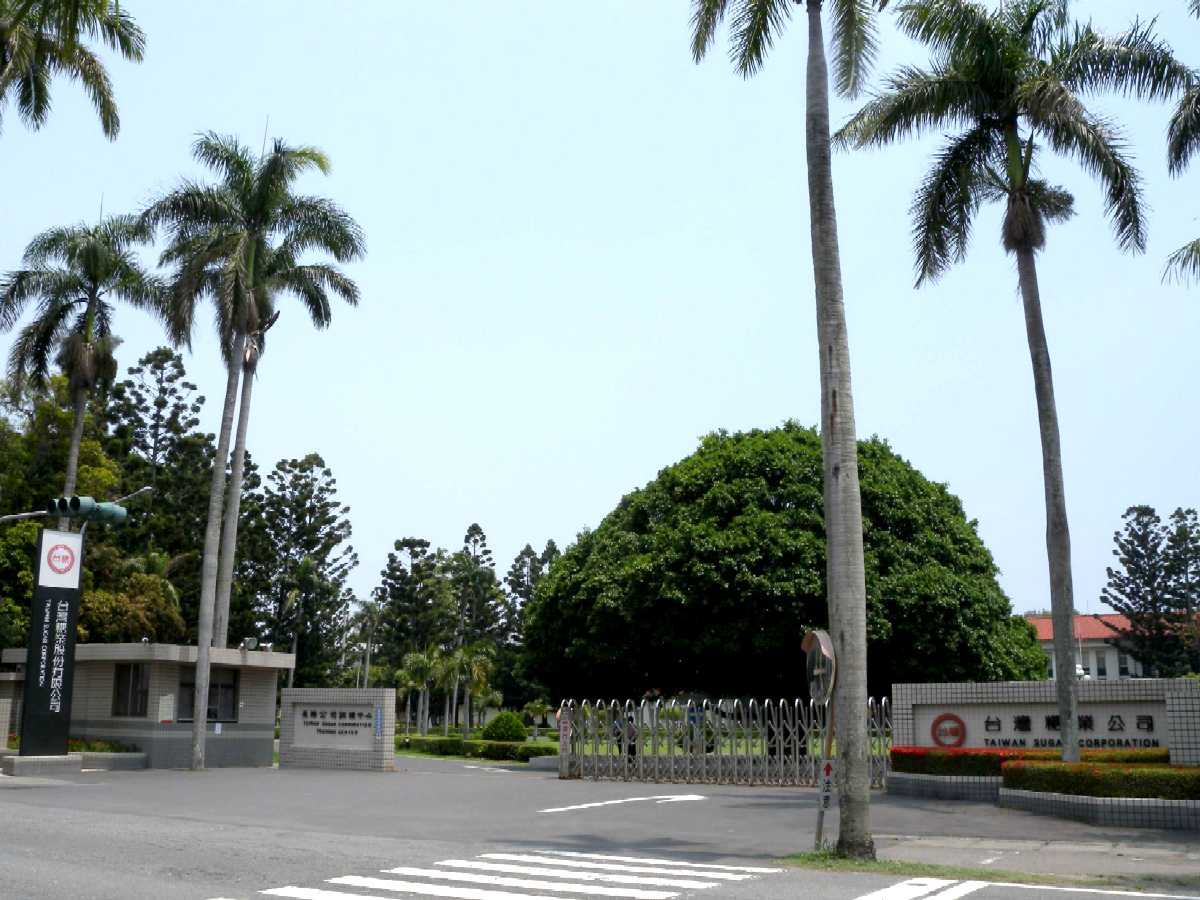
Taisugar Headquarters

Taiwan Sugar Corporation (TSC; Chinese: 台灣糖業股份有限公司; Pe̍h-ōe-jī: Tâi-oân Thn̂g-gia̍p Kó͘-hūn Iú-hān Kong-si; pinyin: Táiwān Tángyè Gōngsī) or Taisugar (Chinese: 台糖; Pe̍h-ōe-jī: Tâi-thn̂g; pinyin: Táitáng) is a state-run enterprise of Taiwan, with headquarters in Tainan City.

== History ==
The corporation was established on 1 May 1946 by the Nationalist government after the handover of Taiwan from Japan to the Republic of China, by merging all of the Japanese-era sugar companies (Dai-Nihon, Taiwan, Meiji, and Ensuiko Sugar Company) in Taiwan. In the 1950s and 1960s, sugar was one of the major exports of Taiwan; the corporation remains a major land owner today.

Taiwan's sugar trade, which flourished for almost 400 years, is now a sunset industry. The Taiwan Sugar Corporation has diversified its business into tourism, floriculture, biotechnology, and retailing. It also operates a chain of gas stations and invests in Taiwan High Speed Rail. It also has a number of significant overseas investments. In 2020 Taiwan Sugar Corporation announced plans to close its largest pig farm in Vietnam and instead invest NT$10.7 billion (US$369 million) in remodeling and improving its pig farms in Taiwan.

== TSC sugar plants ==
- Shanhua Sugar Factory in Shanhua District, Tainan City
- Huwei Sugar Factory in Huwei Township, Yunlin County
- Siaogang Sugar Refinery in Siaogang District, Kaohsiung City

== Developments ==
Taiwan Sugar Corporation has five types of developments — Open Bid Construction, Joint Construction, Community Development, Sugar Factory Fields Development, and Student's Dormitory Development. It also owns the Taiwan Sugar Research Institute.

== Land ownership ==
Taisugar owns 550 km^{2} (210 mi^{2}) of land in Taiwan — 370 km^{2} (140 mi^{2}) are for agricultural purpose and 120 km^{2} (46 mi^{2}) are for contract production.

== See also ==
- Taiwan Sugar Railways
- Taiwan Sugar Research Institute
- List of companies of Taiwan
