= Li Chunsheng =

Chinese businessman (1838–1924)

- 李春生
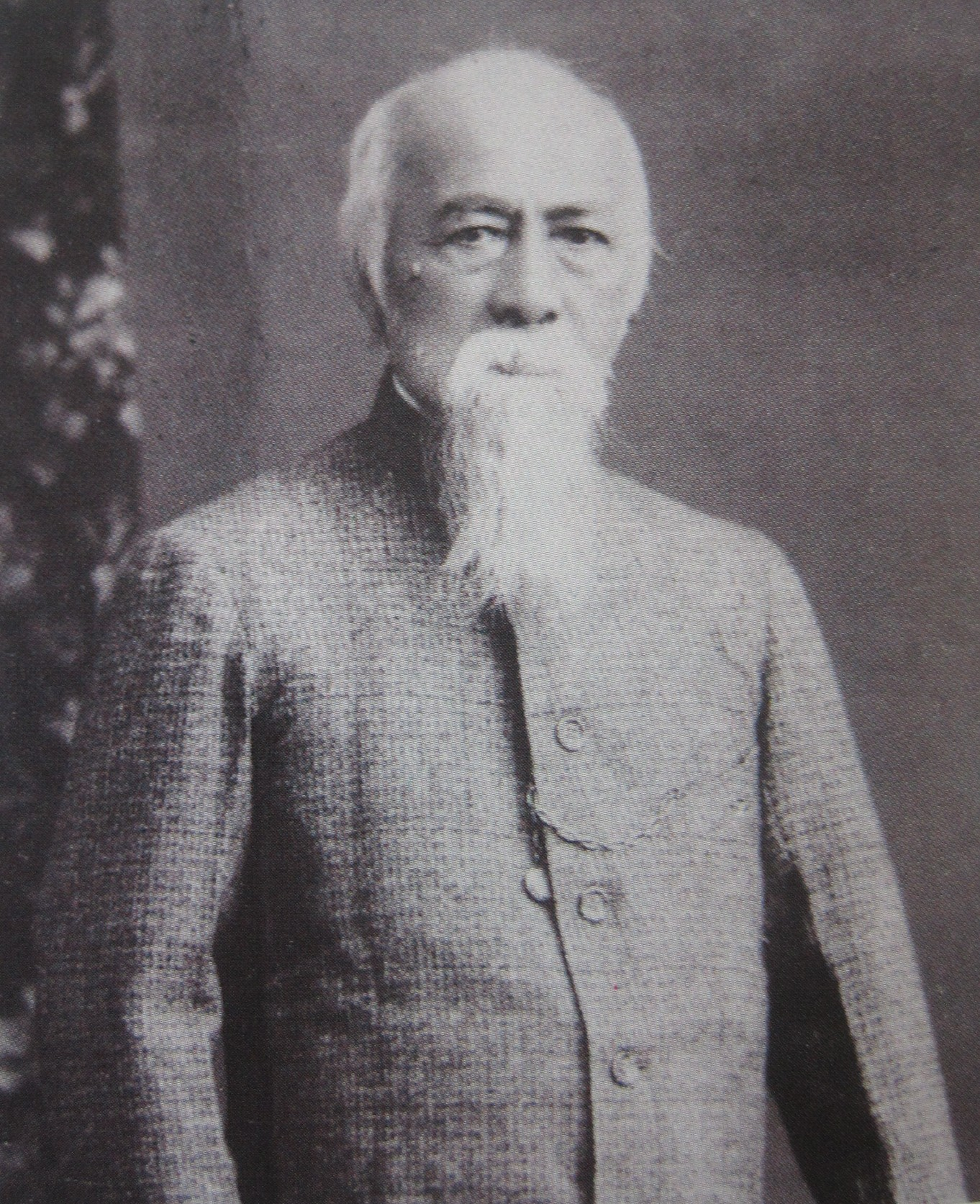
- Li before 1924
- Born: 12 January 1838; Xiamen, Fujian, Qing China
- Died: 5 October 1924 (aged 86); Daitotei, Taihoku Prefecture, Japanese Taiwan
- Occupation: Businessman

Li Chunsheng (Chinese: 李春生; pinyin: Lǐ Chūnshēng; Pe̍h-ōe-jī: Lí Chhun-seng; 12 January 1838 – 7 September 1924) was a Taiwanese businessman and philosopher active during Qing and Japanese era. born in Xiamen, Fujian, he moved to Dadaocheng, Taipei, Taiwan in 1868. He possessed good business managing skills and was highly influential in Taiwan in his time.

== Business career ==
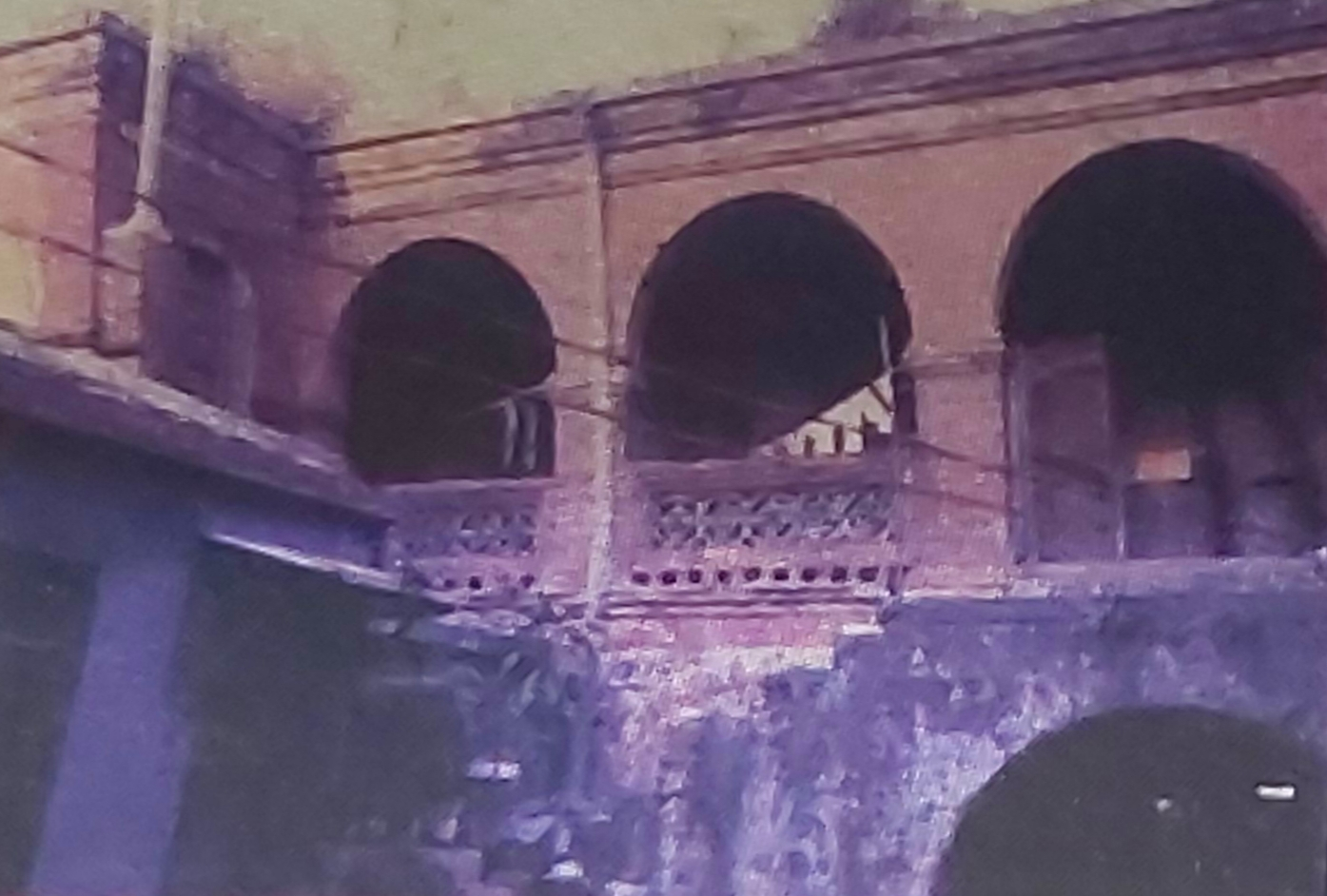
Former Residence of Li Chunsheng at Dadaocheng.

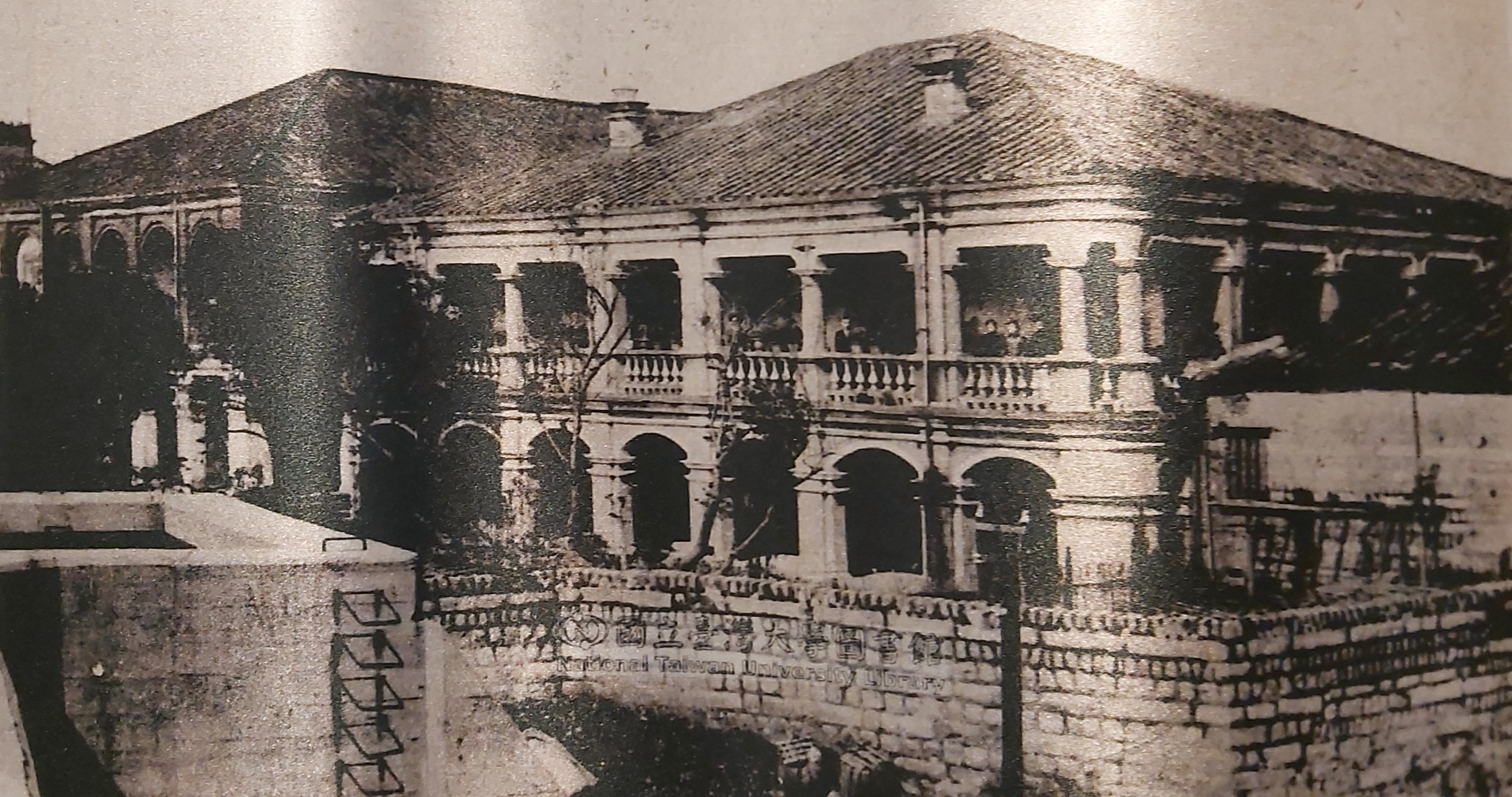
Headquarter of Li Chunsheng at Dadaocheng before 1944.

Li was born in Xiamen, Fujian during the Qing dynasty. His father was a boatman. Because of his poor family background, he only studied at a private school for a short time, and then dropped out to provide for his family as a vendor. In 1852, he became a Christian and started to study English and business. In 1857, he was employed as a manager in the Elles & Co. (怡記洋行), which engaged in trading foreign goods and Chinese tea owned by English businessmen in Xiamen. In 1867, Li transferred to the Dent & Co., which was also owned by English businessmen, where he helped the owner, John Dodd, develop the tea industry in northern Taiwan. Because of his excellent managing skills, tea became the most important export item in that area. After that, Li transferred to Boyd & Co.(和記洋行) as a manager. In the meantime, he produced tea for export and also managed kerosene that belongs to Sanda Petroleum Company (三達石油公司). He earned high profits from his business and became very wealthy.

== Relationship with the government ==
Li was not only a great businessman, but also a man of public spirit. The Qing government relied on him heavily. In 1878, he donated money enthusiastically, and also took part in supervising to build Taipei City. In 1880, he was nominated by Ding Richang (丁日昌), the Governor of Taiwan, to be a tongzhi (同知; an official of the fifth class) under the Qing government. He was also awarded the privilege of wearing a peacock feather in his official hat.

When Taiwan came under Japanese rule after the 1895 Treaty of Shimonoseki, Li started the Protecting the Good Department (保良局) and Business Labour Union (士商工會) with other local businessmen. In recognition of his service, the Japanese government awarded him the 6th Class (Silver Rays) Order of the Rising Sun. In 1902, he was appointed as a counsellor of Taipei. In 1922, he was made a counsellor of the Taiwan Editorial Committee of Historical Materials. He died at the age of 88 on 5 October 1924.

== Works written by Li ==
=== Works related to religion and philosophy ===
From 1874 to 1894, Li wrote books such as A New Compilation of God's Works (主津新集), After Evolution and Ethics (天演論書後), Eastern and Western Philosophy and Its Sequel (東西哲衡及續集), Research on Five Virtues in Religious Perspective (宗教五德備考), and Explaining the Bible (聖經闡要講義). These books contained his ideas on current affairs, feudal ethical codes and folkways, Christian doctrines, and reviews of Eastern and Western philosophical views. He also used ideas adapted from his Christian beliefs to criticise the Western powers for their aggression towards China and the corruption within the Qing government of China. In 1901, he was nominated as the Presbyter of Dadaocheng Presbyterian Church (大稻埕長老教會) and Daqiao Church (大橋教會). In his time, he was praised for his wide knowledge of China and other countries, and of ancient and contemporary literature.

=== Works of literature ===
Apart from the books about religion and philosophy, Li also contributed to literature. His most important literature work is Essays on Sixty-Four Days' Journey to the East (東遊六十四日隨筆). In February, 1896, Li accompanied Kabayama Sukenori, the first Japanese Governor-General of Taiwan, on a tour in Japan. He also sent his six grandsons to study in Japan. After he returned to Taiwan on 26 April 1896, he wrote about his observations and thoughts from his trip to Japan, and had them published in the newspaper and as a book by Fuzhou Meihua Bookstore (福州美華書局). In this book, Li used simple classical Chinese to describe Japanese natural and human landscapes, and he also expressed his admiration of Japanese ideas of modernisation, education, religion and lifestyles. In the foreword, he used anno Domini (AD) and the Guangxu era to number years, but also used the Meiji era to number years in the preface. The use of these different methods to express time reflected the regime changes that took place in Taiwan between the late 19th century and early 20th century. Even though Li praised Japanese modernisation, he still saw Japan as an aggressor. His mental state of cultural conflicts, struggling and changes reflected in his book specifically and delicately. His drawings and discussions also reflected his feelings and thoughts about Japan, his strong Christian faith, and his perspectives of Taiwan under Japanese rule.
