= Old Tainan Magistrate Residence =

Former house in East, Tainan, Taiwan

- 原臺南縣知事官邸
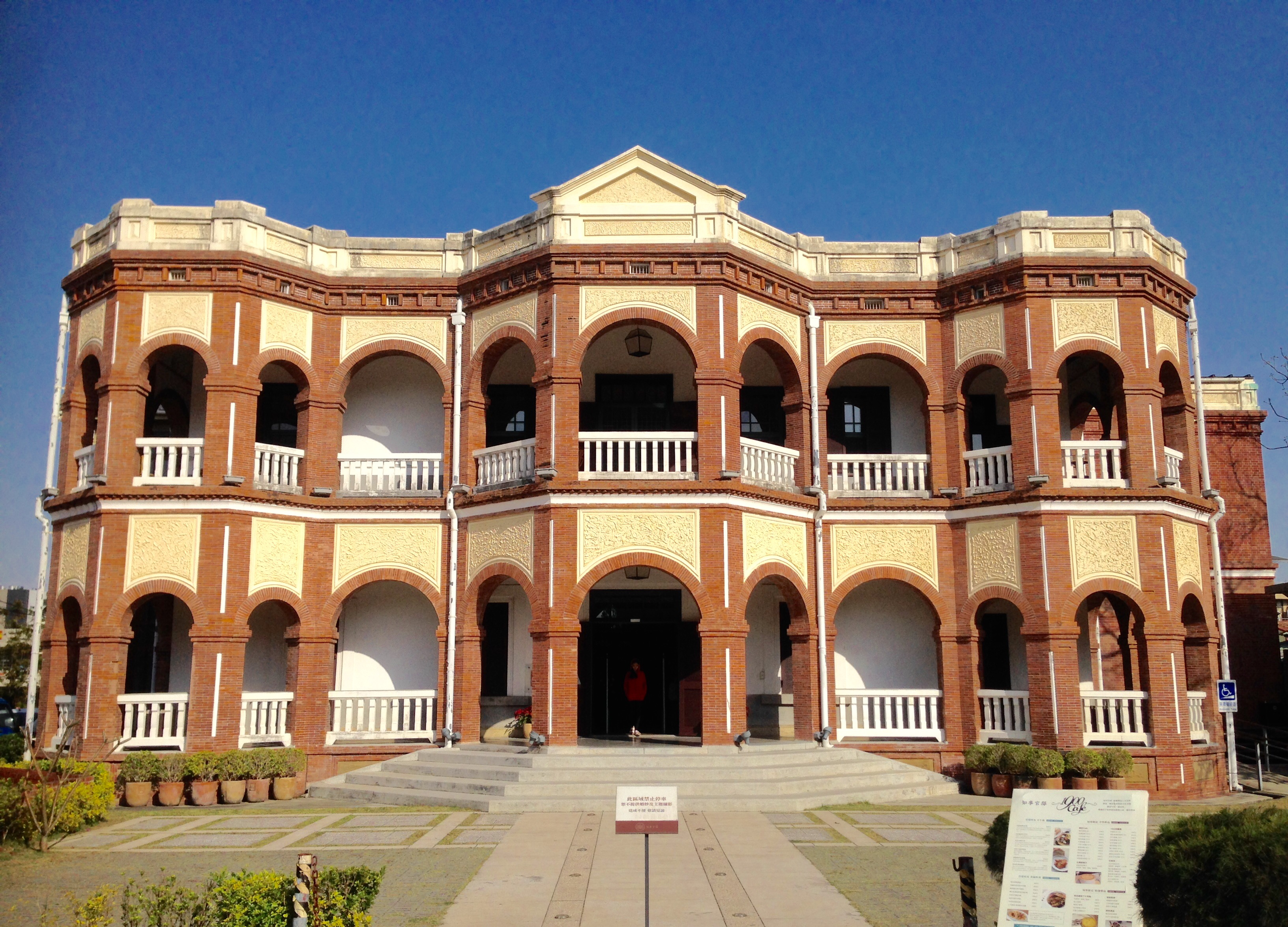

General information
- Type: former residence
- Location: East, Tainan, Taiwan
- Coordinates: 22°59′33.5″N 120°12′48.6″E
- Completed: 1900

Technical details
- Floor count: 2

Website
- Official website

The Old Tainan Magistrate Residence (traditional Chinese: 原臺南縣知事官邸; simplified Chinese: 原台南县知事官邸; pinyin: Yuán Táinán Xiàn Zhīshì Guāndǐ) or The Clock Building is a historical residential building in East District, Tainan, Taiwan.

== History ==
=== Empire of Japan ===
The magistrate residence building was originally constructed in 1900 as the residence for the Tainan Prefecture Governor Imai Konichi (Japanese: 今井艮一). In November 1901, the Cho administrative system was established, and the minister was moved to the nearby Tainan Minister's Residence. The magistrate residence building was then managed by Tainan Hall. Part of it was then lend to the army but was changed to become the Brigade Magistrate Residence. When Tainan Governor the Empire of Japan royal family came to visit Tainan, the magistrate residence building was named Tainan Governor's Residence. In 1920, prefectures continued to change and Tainan Minister was assigned to be Tainan Prefecture Governor. The official residence of the governor was changed back to the magistrate residence building and was named Tainan Prefecture Magistrate Residence. In 1936, an underground air raid shelter was built at the southeast side of the building due to the Second Sino-Japanese War. Fortunately, the building survived the war.

=== Republic of China ===
After the handover of Taiwan from Japan to the Republic of China in 1945, the building was partially rebuilt and was briefly used by the Taiwan Salt General Office and local Land Office. In the 1980s, it was used as the headquarter office for the Civil Defense and District Office. In 1998, it was declared as a historical building. After the declaration, the Cultural Affairs Bureau of Tainan City Government launched a restoration project that would last for about 10 years and outsourced its building management in 2010. On 8 October 2011, the building was reopened as Magistrate Residence Concert Hall when it was turned into a restaurant and café by Taiwan Artists Ensemble Culture Foundation. On 8 February 2015, the building was then renamed as Magistrate Residence when the Koche Development Co., Ltd. opened the 1900 Café, Knowledge Salon and Time of Old Tainan County Magistrate Residence. On 10 October 2020, the building was then placed under Antio Design Co., Ltd. in which they will reopened it as Magistrate Residence Living Center in which will house exhibitions, lectures, household items, afternoon tea, meals and beverages.

== Architecture ==
The residence is a two-story building with English colonial architectural style. It has an arcade around the building which extends at the center and the two sides of the building, which are covered with bricks.

== Photo gallery ==
Old Tainan Magistrate Residence

Old Tainan Magistrate Residence

Front entrance

Second floor balcony

corridor in second floor

== See also ==
- List of tourist attractions in Taiwan
- Tainan City Government
- Taiwan under Japanese rule
