= Taiwan Banana Research Institute =

Research center in Pingtung County, Taiwan

Taiwan Banana Research Institute 財團法人台灣香蕉研究所
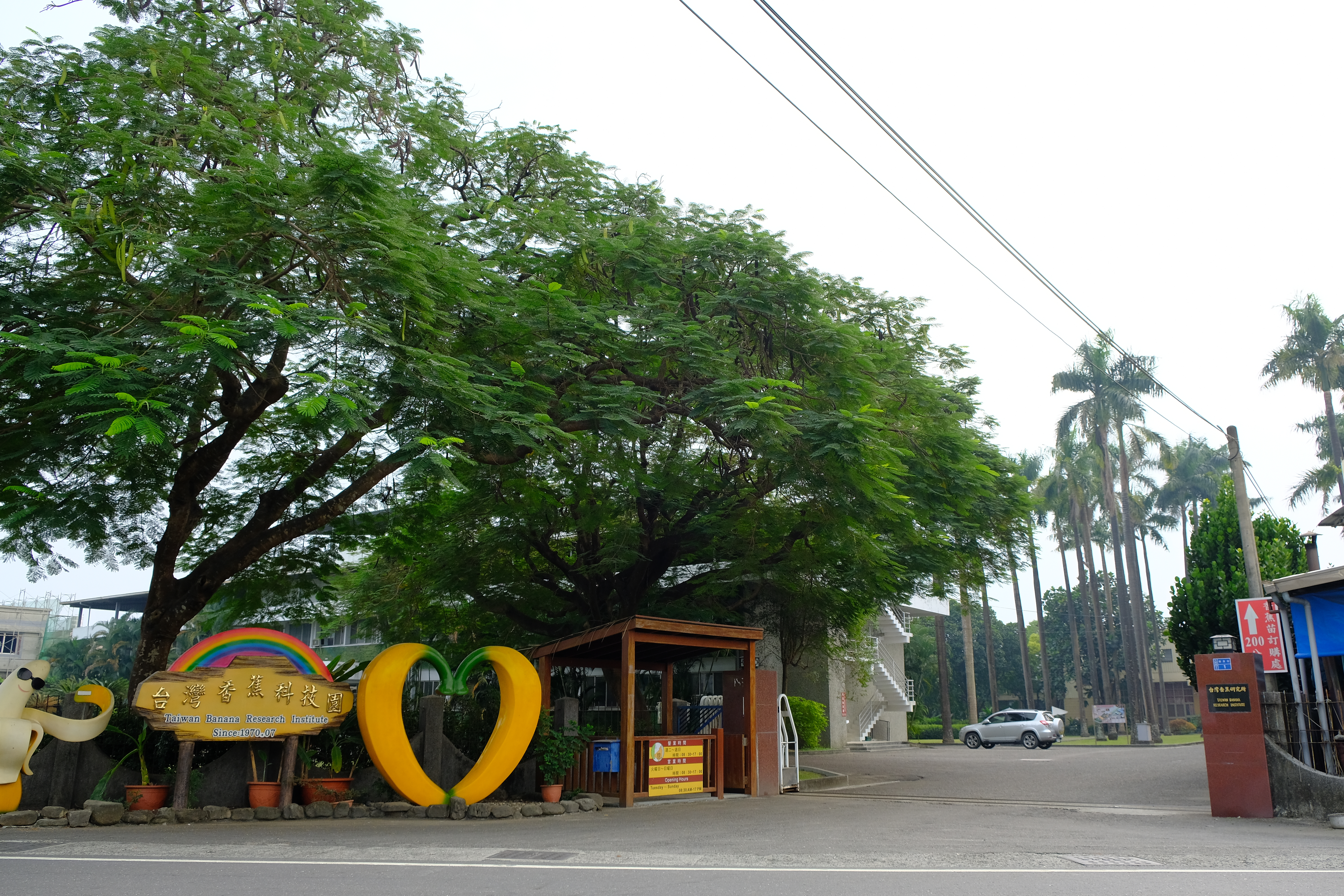
- Established: 1970
- Chair: Hsieh Min-chu
- Director: Hwang Shin-chuan
- Location: Pingtung County, Taiwan
- Website: www.banana.org.tw

The Taiwan Banana Research Institute (TBRI; Chinese: 財團法人台灣香蕉研究所) specializes in the breeding of bananas and research about their cultivation and diseases. Bananas are Taiwan's most important export fruit.

== History ==
The TBRI was founded in 1970 in response to the devastation in 1967 of Taiwan's banana industry by the Panama disease. The original sponsors were the Taiwan Banana Fruit Quality Improvement association, the Taiwan Provincial Fruit and Marketing Cooperative, and the Joint Commission on Rural Reconstruction.

In response to TR4 the TBRI grew millions of tissue-cultured banana plantlets in the hopes of generating beneficial mutations which would improve resistance to TR4. From these two Giant Cavendish Tissue Culture Variants known as GCTCV 218 and GCTCV 219 which have increased resistance to TR4.

== Developed varieties ==
=== Formosana ===
The Formosana is resistant to Panama disease TR4.

== See also ==
- Taiwan Sugar Research Institute
