= John Dodd (tea merchant) =

English tea merchant (1838 - 1907)

John Dodd (October 25, 1838 - July 15, 1907) was a Scottish merchant who helped promote Taiwan tea to the west in the late 19th century. In 1860, he arrived at Taiwan to do some research for the first time. In 1865, John Dodd established the Dodd & Co in Qing-era Taiwan.

== Bibliography ==
- Dodd, John (1888). Journal of a Blockaded Resident in North Formosa during the Franco-Chinese War, 1884-5. OCLC 464653492. OL 24154022M.
- Yen, Ching-hwang. Ethnic Chinese Business In Asia: History, Culture And Business Enterprise.
