= Taiwan Sugar Research Institute =

Research center in East, Tainan, Taiwan

Taiwan Sugar Research Institute 台糖研究所 Tâi-thn̂g Gián-kiù-só͘
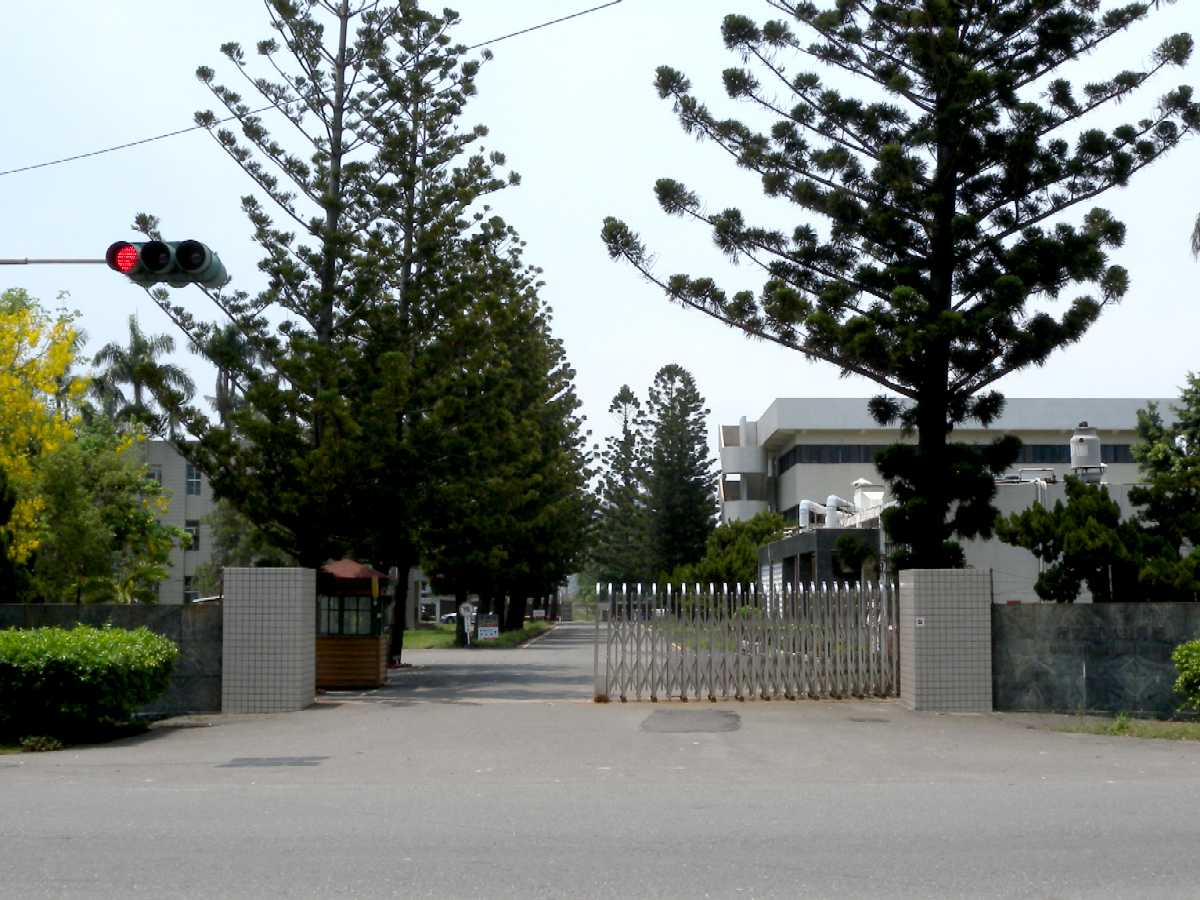
- Established: 1901
- Owner: Taiwan Sugar Corporation
- Location: East, Tainan, Taiwan
- Coordinates: 22°57′56.3″N 120°13′13.3″E
- Interactive map of Taiwan Sugar Research Institute 台糖研究所; Tâi-thn̂g Gián-kiù-só͘
- Website: Official website (in Chinese)

The Taiwan Sugar Research Institute (TSRI; Chinese: 台糖研究所; pinyin: Táitáng Yánjiūsuǒ; Pe̍h-ōe-jī: Tâi-thn̂g Gián-kiù-só͘) is a sugar research center of Taiwan Sugar Corporation in East District, Tainan, Taiwan.

== History ==
The research center was founded in 1901 during the Japanese colonial era.

== Facilities ==
The research center spread over 387 hectares of land, including 375 hectares of experimental farmland. It contains a series of bio-reactors and downstream processing facilities, such as chromatography columns, membrane separators, spray drier and crystallizer.

== Research ==
The current research TSRI is undergoing is to find new techniques to raise as much sugarcane as possible per area of usable land and to discover new and resistant sugarcane species from disease and pests.

The Taiwan Sugar Research Institute has collaborated with the National Kaohsiung University of Hospitality and Tourism to produce rhum agricole from the sugarcane variety ROC24. In 2025 two of the research batches won gold medals at the Vinalies Internationales competition in France.

== See also ==
- Agriculture in Taiwan
- Taiwan Agricultural Research institute
- Taiwan Banana Research Institute
