= East District, Tainan =

East 東區
- District
- East District
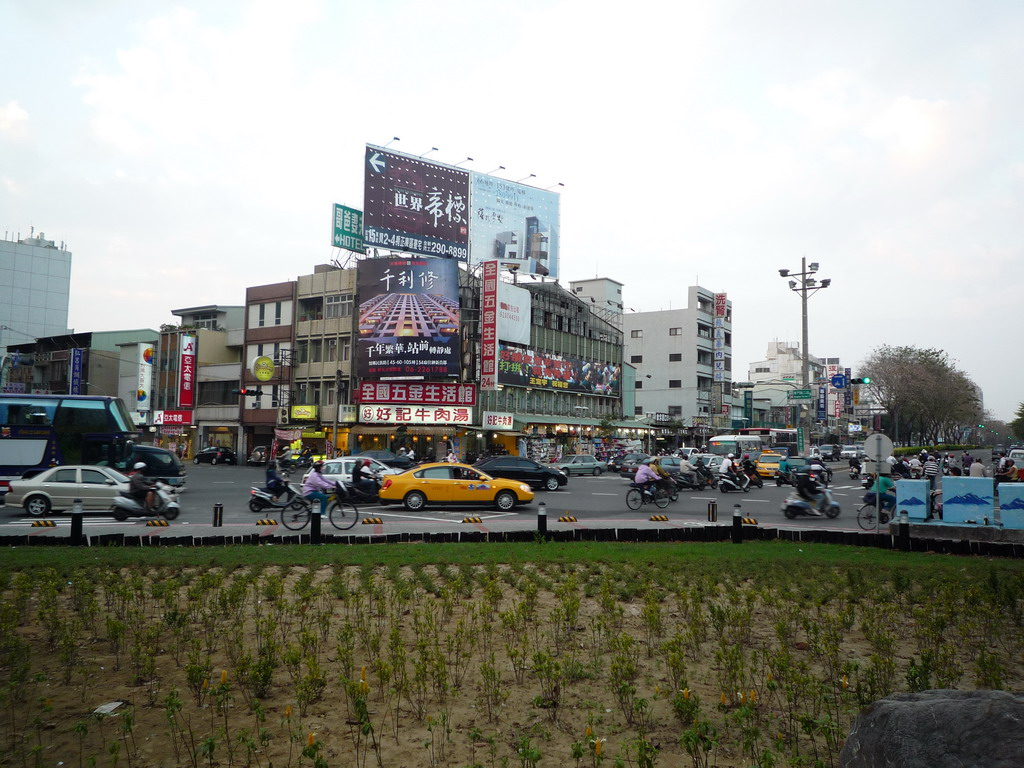

- East District in Tainan City
- Coordinates: 22.985736°N 120.226036°E
- Country: Taiwan
- Special municipality: Tainan

Area
  - Total: 12.7221 km^{2} (4.9120 sq mi)

Population (January 2023)
  - Total: 180,828
  - Density: 14,213.7/km^{2} (36,813.3/sq mi)
- Website: www.tneast.gov.tw/en/

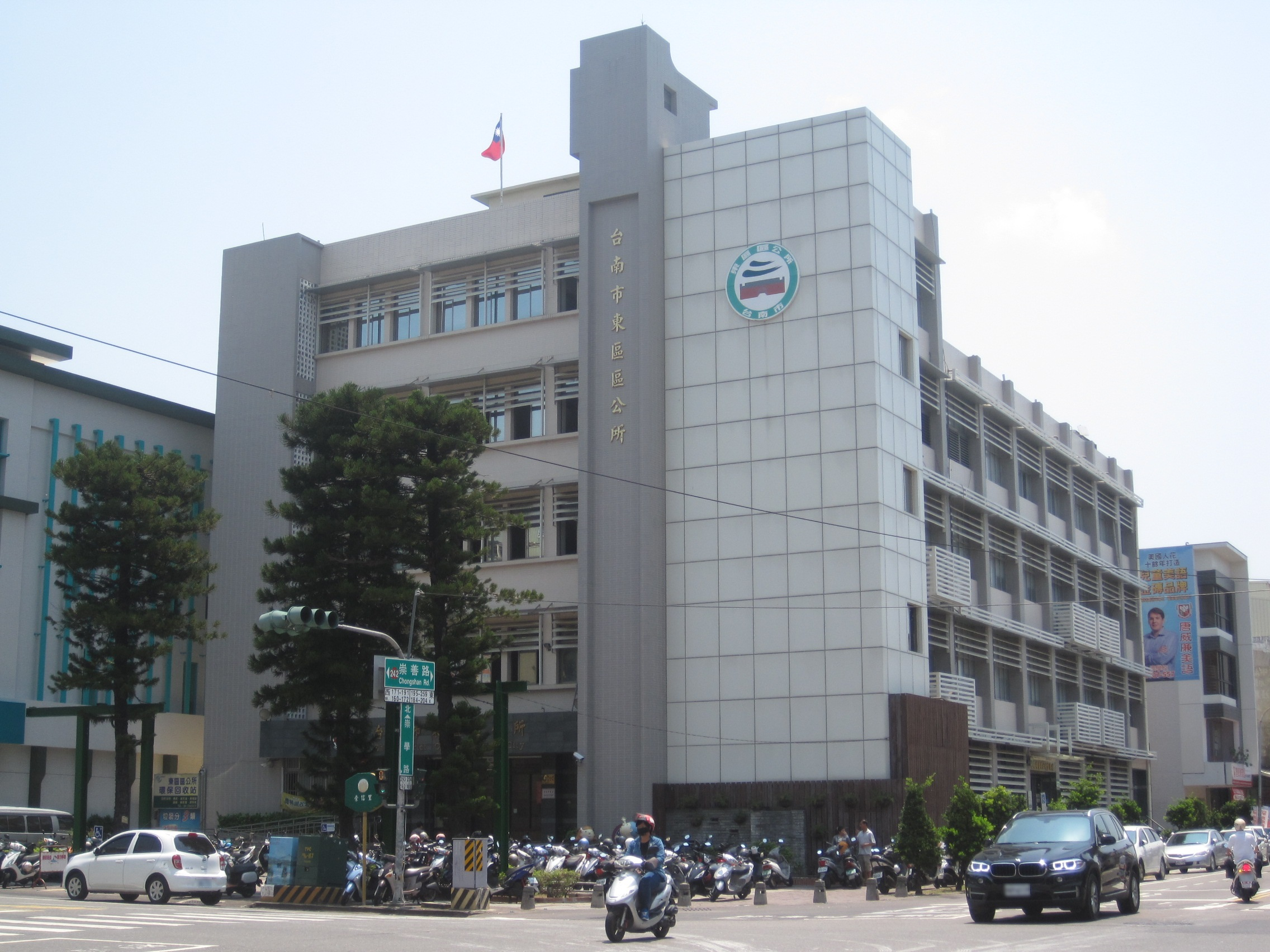
East District office

East District (Chinese: 東區; pinyin: Dōng Qū; Pe̍h-ōe-jī: Tang-khu) is a district home to 180,828 people located in Tainan, Taiwan.

== History ==
East District was formed with the merging of Dongmen and Zhuwei and part of Kaishan and Zhaohe in 1945. The East District Office was originally established in Mituo Temple.

In April 1946, Dapu, Gongming, Junwang, Kaishan, and Wufei were added to the district, which made the district consisted of 26 villages. In July 1946, the district office moved to Junwang Temple.

In March 1948, Dalin dan Zhusi was added to the district, which made the district consist of 28 villages.

In February 1954, Annei, Anwai, Dapu and Jioupu were consolidated into Chuanbei, Chuannan, Longshan and Siaonan Villages and Dalin, Ludong and Xiaodong were subdivided into Dafu, Daming, Dong'an, Qianfong, Xinsheng Villages, resulting in a total of 26 villages under the district.

In March 1964, the district office moved to Weimin Street.

In 1967, the district went for readjustment and it governed 30 villages.

In February 1972, Ludong and Xiaodong were subdivided into 4 villages after the addition of Daxing and Daxue, which made the district governing 32 villages.

In September 1973, each of Dafu, Daling and Qianfong Village was divided into two villages, and also Dade, Dazhong and Yule were added to the district, making the district governing 35 villages.

In July 1974, Degao was subdivided into Degao, Dazhih and Renhe, while Houjia was subdivided into Dongguang and Houjia, and Dong'an was subdivided into Dong'an and Xindong, resulting in the district governing 39 villages.

In 1978, Huwei was subdivided into Fuqiang and Huwei, making a total of 40 villages under the district.

In June 1979, the district office was moved to Chongxue Road.

In March 1981, Huwei was subdivided into Huwei and Zichang while Chonghui was subdivided into Conghui and Weiguo, making a total of 42 villages under the district.

In April 1982, Chuannan, Fahua, Junwang, Kaishan and Xiaonan were consolidated into Central District while Daen, Dalin, Dazhong and Xinsheng were consolidated into South District. In August 1982, Degao was subdivided into Chongshan, Chongxue and Degao, Dongguang was subdivided into Dongguang, Yunong and Zhuangjing, Fuqiang was subdivided into Fuqiang and Fuyu, Zhongxiao was subdivided into Chongming and Zhongxiao and Renhe was subdivided into Heping and Renhe, resulting a total of 40 villages under the district.

In May 1994, Chongshan was subdivided into Chongcheng and Chongshan, Dazhih was subdivided into Dazhih and Dongzhih and Guangsheng was subdivided into Dongsheng and Guangsheng, making a total of 45 villages and 1,105 neighborhoods under the district.

On 4 February 2002, the number of neighborhoods under the district increased to 1,207.

On 9 January 2006, Guangsheng was subdivided into Guangsheng, Nansheng and Wensheng, making a total of 47 villages and 1,279 neighborhoods under the district.

On 27 July 2010, owing to Zhongxing Village and Fuguo Village was incorporated into Houjia Village, the district managed 45 villages and 1,240 neighborhoods. On 29 January 2018, the number of neighborhoods decreased to 877.

== Administrative divisions ==
Administrative divisions of East District

The district consists of Chongxin, Chongxue, Chongde, Chongshan, Chongcheng, Chongwen, Tungzhi, Dazhi, Degao, Renhe, Heping, Huwei, Yusheng, Fuxing, Zijiang, Tungsheng, Guansheng, Nasheng, Wensheng, Houjia, Tungguang, Tungming, Zhuangjing, Xiaotung, Daxue, Chengda, Tungmen, Weixia, Zhongxi, Tungan, Xintung, Chonghui, Weiguo, Yunong, Fujiang, Fuyu, Zhongxiao, Chongming, Dafu, Dade, Lutung, Datong, Quannan, Longshan and Deguang Village.

== Institutions ==
- Taiwan Sugar Research Institute

== Education ==
=== Universities and colleges ===
- National Cheng Kung University
- National University of Tainan
- Tainan Theological College and Seminary

=== Senior high schools ===
- National Tainan First Senior High School
- Private Chang Jung Senior High School
- Private Chang Jung Girl's Senior High School
- Private Deguang Senior High School
- Private Kuang Hua Girl's Senior High School
- Private Salesian Technical School
- The Affiliated Senior Industrial Vocational Continuing Education High School of National Cheng Kung University

=== Junior high schools ===
- Tainan Municipal Houjia Junior High School
- Tainan Municipal Fusing Junior High School
- Tainan Municipal Chongming Junior High School
- Tainan Municipal Jhongsiao Junior High School

== Tourist attractions ==
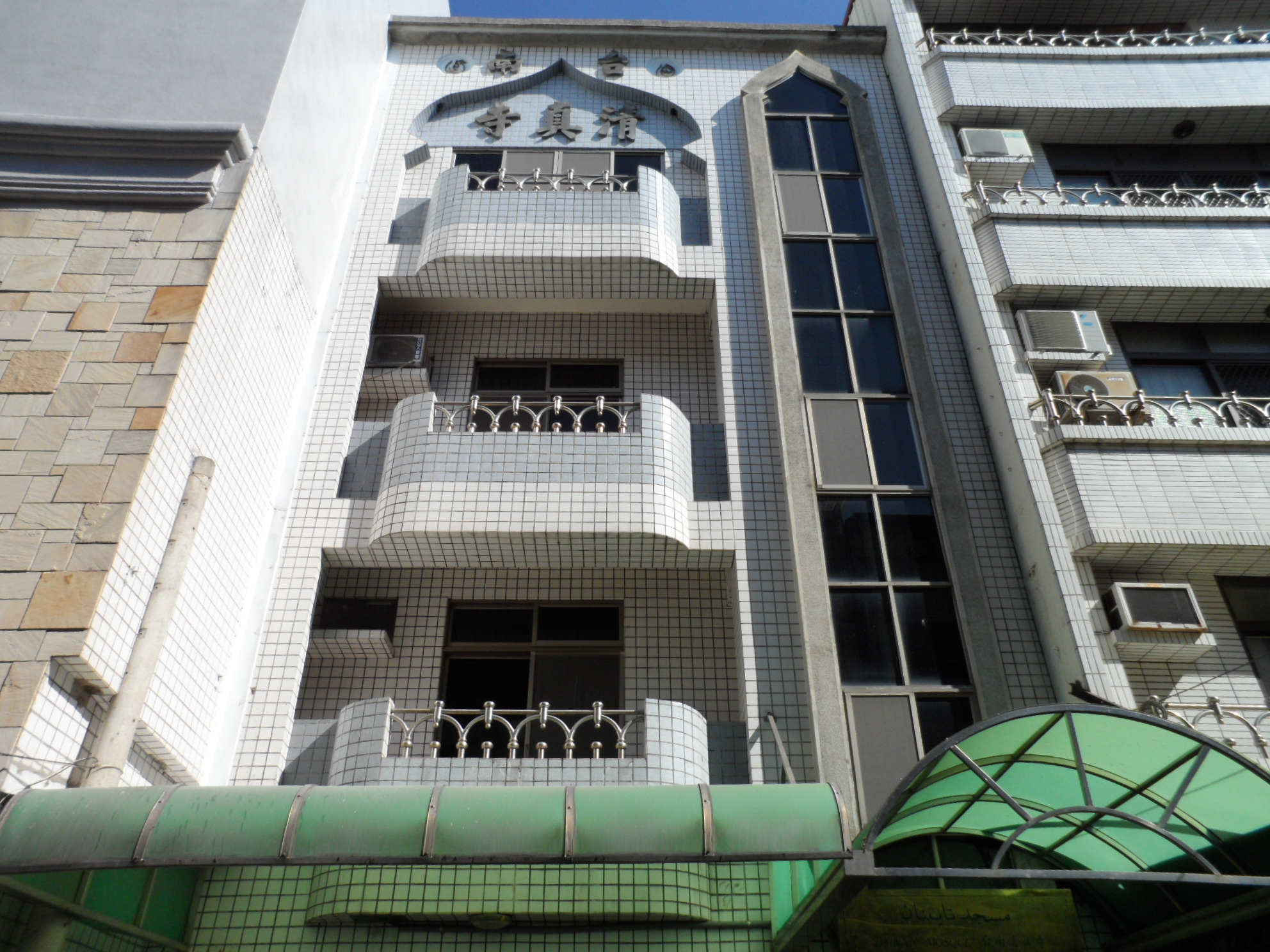
Tainan Mosque

- Barclay Memorial Park
- National Cheng Kung University Museum
- Old Tainan Magistrate Residence
- Tainan Mosque
- Tainan Municipal Cultural Center
- Taiwan Sugar Museum

== Hospitals ==
- Tainan Municipal Hospital
- Sin-Lau Hospital

== Transportation ==
=== Rail ===
- Tainan Station
- Linsen Station (Use after the Tainan Project be completed)
- South Tainan Station (Use after the Tainan Project be completed)

=== Road ===
- Provincial Highway 1

== Notable people ==
- Tzuyu, member of Korean girl group Twice
- Lin Fei-fan, activist
- Shone An, former singer, actor and host

== See also ==
- Tainan
